= Taronga Zoo =

Zoo in Mosman, New South Wales, Australia

- Taronga Zoo logo

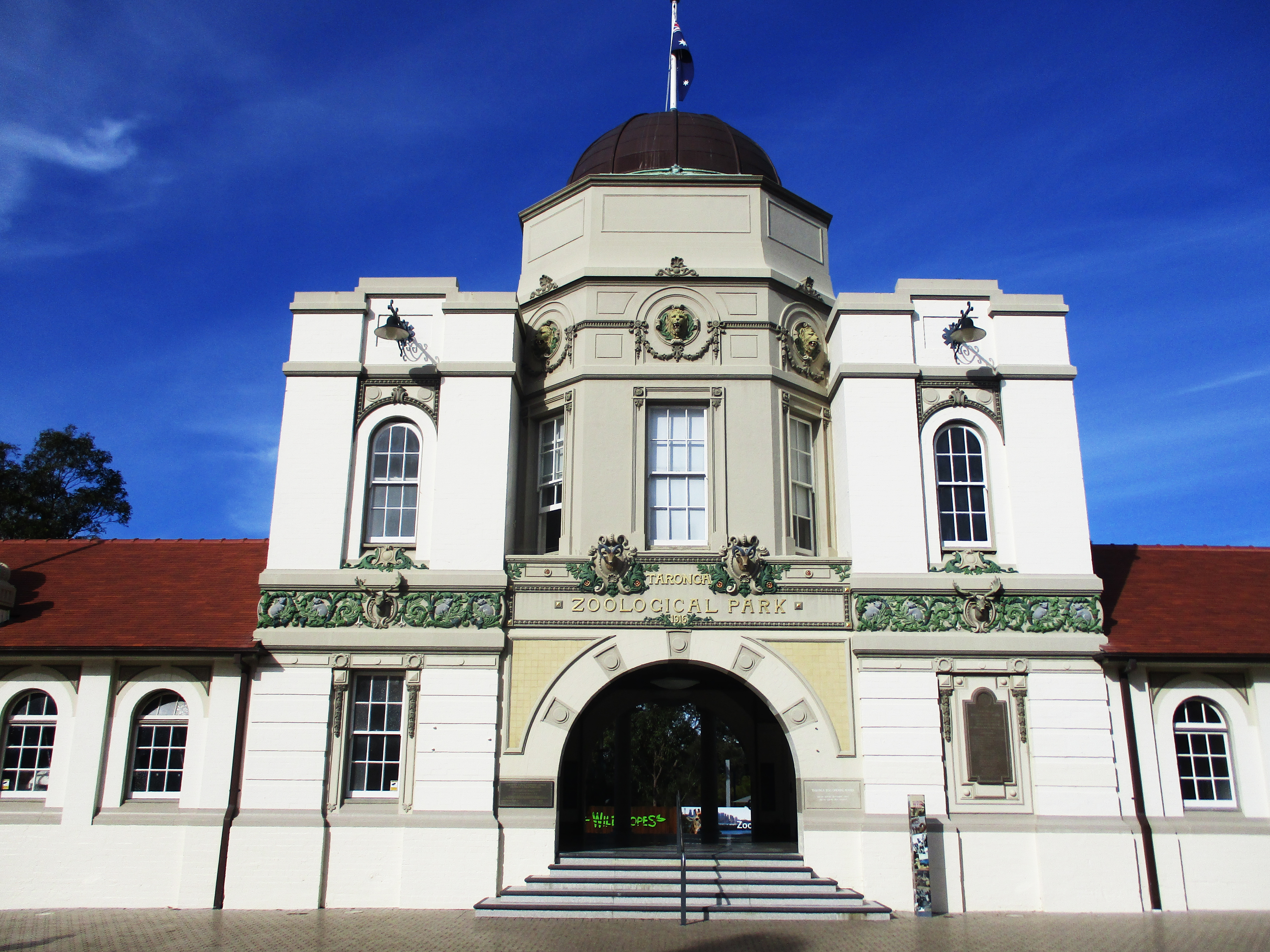
- Taronga Zoo Sydney upper entrance
- Interactive map of Taronga Zoo
- 33°50′36″S 151°14′28″E
- Date opened: 7 October 1916; 110 years ago (1884 at Moore Park site)
- Location: Bradleys Head Road, Mosman, Sydney, New South Wales, Australia
- Land area: 28 hectares (69 acres)
- No. of animals: 5,000+
- No. of species: 350+
- Memberships: ZAA
- Website: taronga.org.au/taronga-zoo

Taronga Zoo Sydney is a government-run public zoo located in Sydney, New South Wales, Australia, in the Lower North Shore suburb of Mosman, on the shores of Sydney Harbour. It has views of Sydney Harbour and the city. The opening hours are between 9:30 a.m. to 4:30 p.m. (May to August) and 9:30 am to 5:00 pm (September to April). Taronga is an Aboriginal word meaning "beautiful view".

It was officially opened on 7 October 1916. Taronga Zoo Sydney is managed by the Zoological Parks Board of New South Wales, under the trading name Taronga Conservation Society, along with its sister zoo, the Taronga Western Plains Zoo in Dubbo.

Divided into various zoogeographic regions, the 28-hectare (69-acre) Taronga Zoo Sydney is home to more than 5,000 animals of approximately 350 different species. It has a zoo shop, a cafe, and an information centre.

== History ==
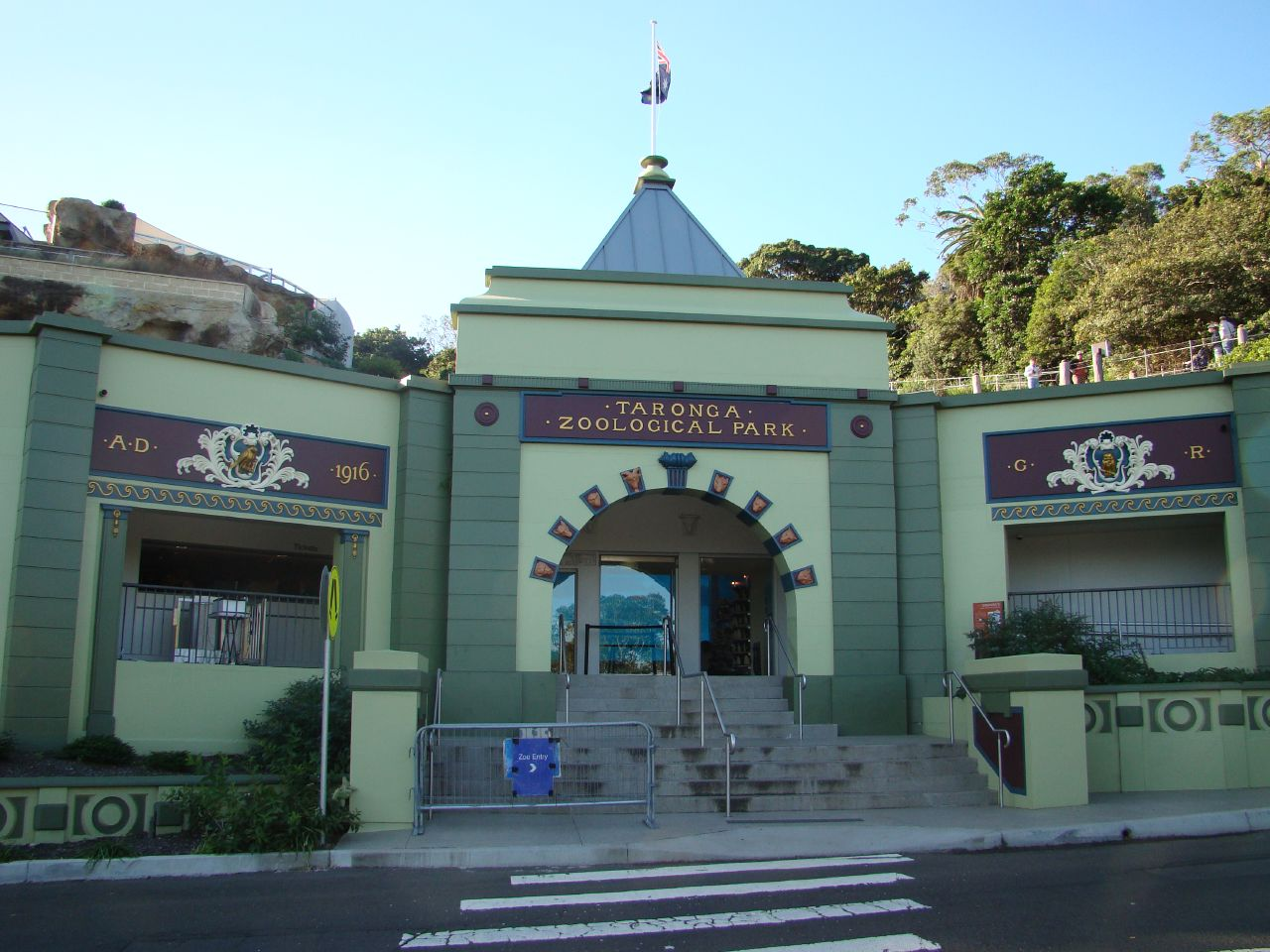
Taronga Zoo lower-level entrance

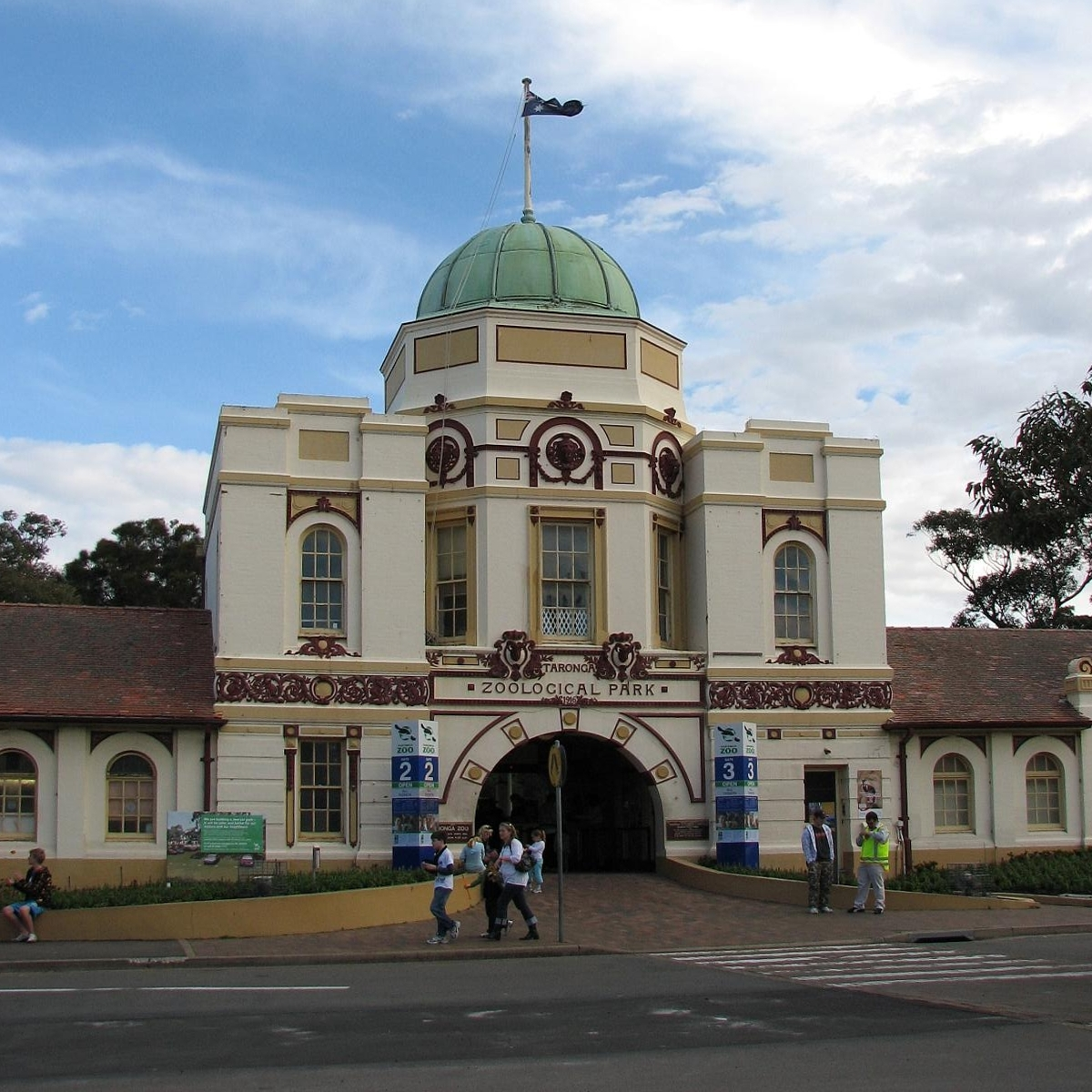
The historic entrance of Taronga Zoo

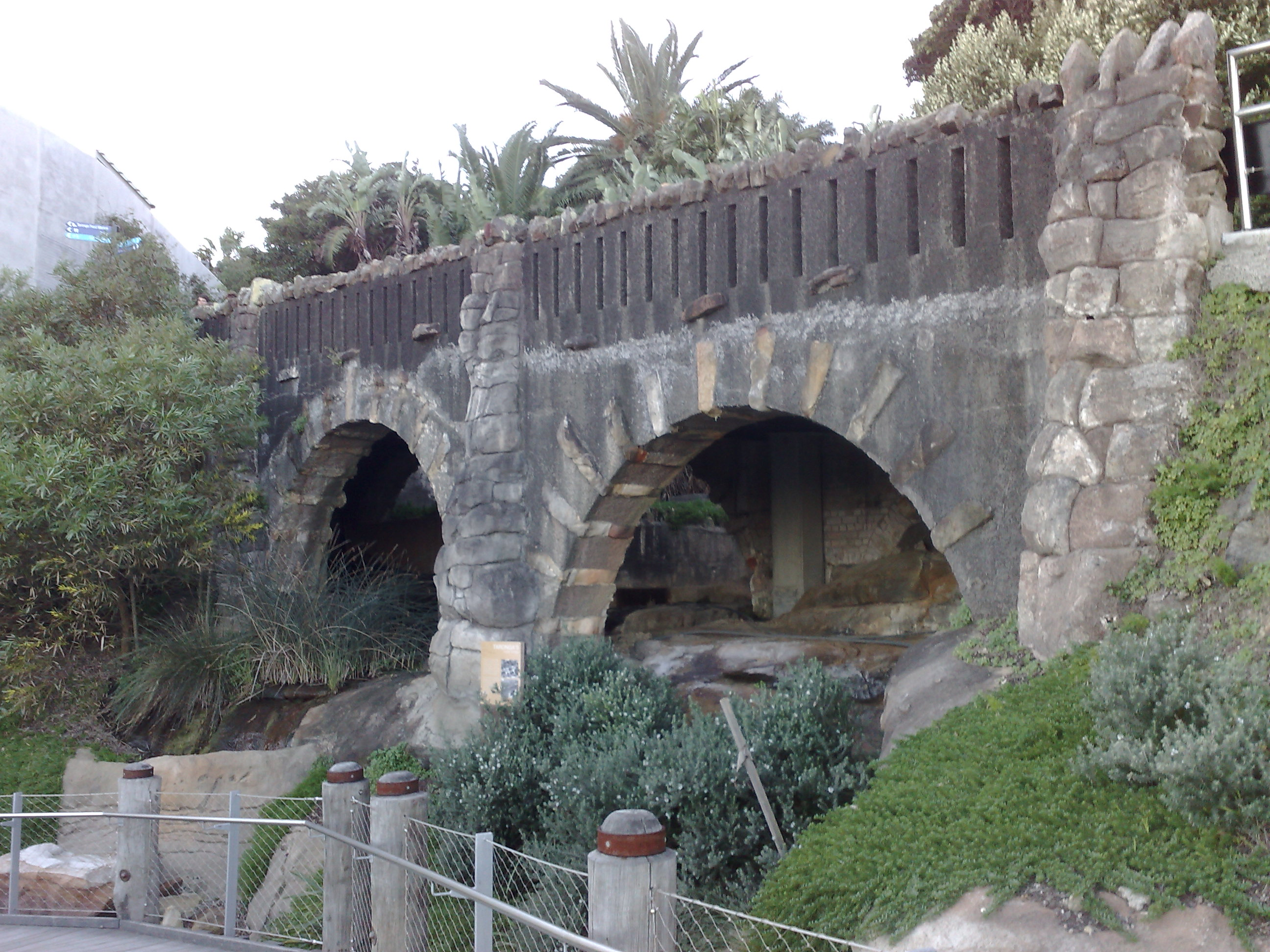
Rustic Bridge, a historical relic of the zoo

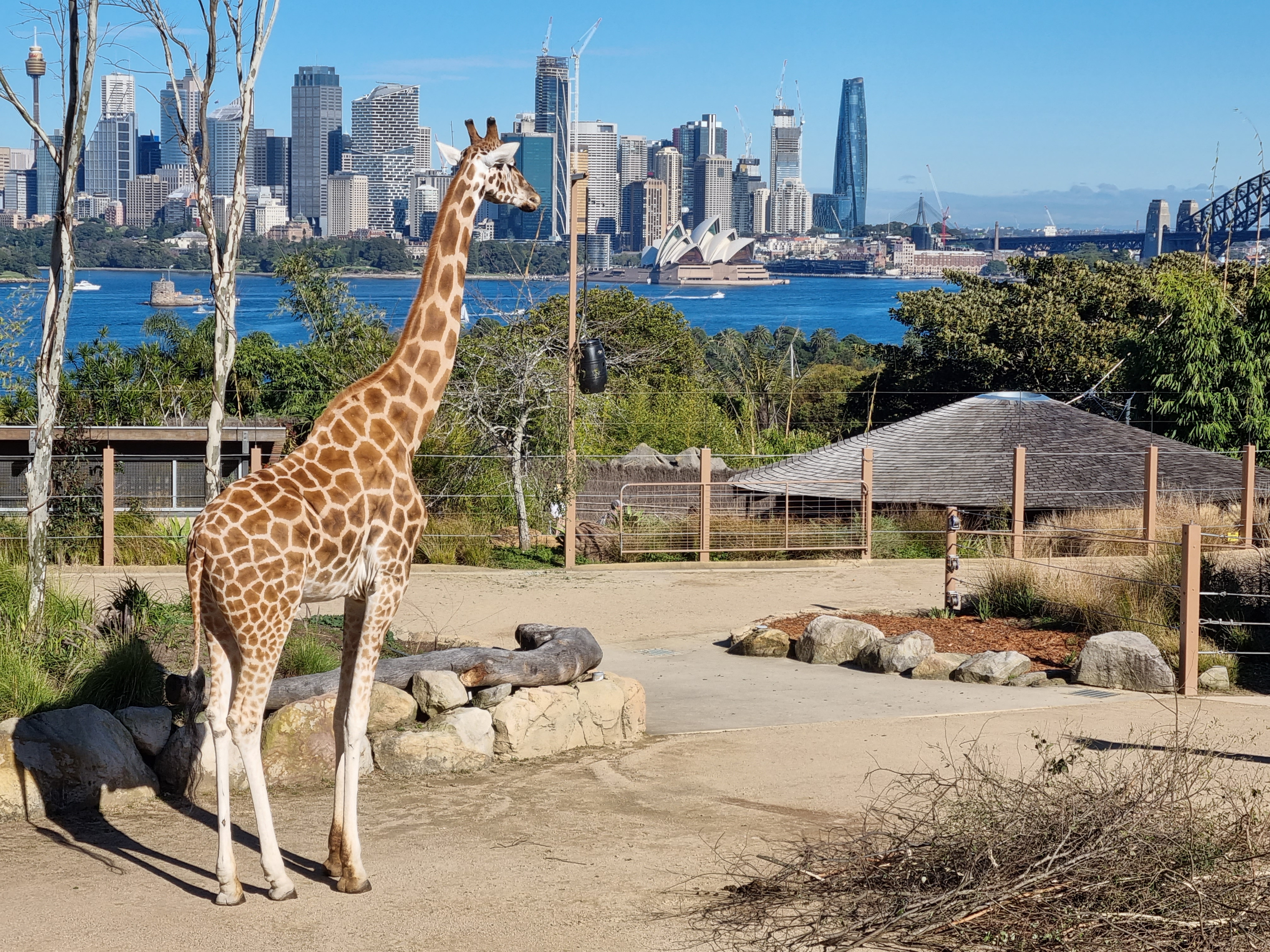
Giraffe in front of Sydney's skyline in African Savannah exhibit

The Royal Zoological Society of New South Wales opened the first public zoo in New South Wales in 1884 at Billy Goat Swamp in Moore Park, on a site now occupied by Sydney Boys High School and Sydney Girls High School. Inspired by a 1908 visit to the Hamburg Zoo, the secretary of the zoo, Albert Sherbourne Le Souef, envisioned a new zoo based on the bar-less concept. After realising that the Moore Park site was too small, the NSW Government granted 43 acres (17 ha) of land north of Sydney Harbour. A further 9 acres (3.6 ha) were later granted in 1916, and the zoo at its current site opened to the public on 7 October 1916.

=== Rustic Bridge ===
The "Rustic Bridge" was opened in 1915 and was one of Taronga Zoo's earliest landscape features. It was the main way in which visitors could cross the natural gully that it spans. Early photographs show it as a romantic pathway secluded by plantings. The rustic effect was created by embedding stones in the wall and like the aquarium, its design was reminiscent of Italian grottoes.

=== Late 20th century ===
A critical review in 1967 led to a new emphasis on scientific conservation, education and preservation. New exhibits were built starting with the Platypus and Nocturnal houses, waterfowl ponds and walkthrough Rainforest Aviary. A Veterinary Quarantine Centre was built as was an Education Centre (funded by the Department of Education). Previous attractions such as elephant rides, miniature trains, monkey circus and merry-go-round gave way to educational facilities such as Friendship Farm and Seal Theatre (these latter two exhibits completed in the late 1970s).

=== Sky Safari ===
A gondola lift (known as the Sky Safari) was installed in 1987 and updated in 2000, transporting passengers between the bottom of the park close to the ferry wharf, and to the top end of the zoo.

==== Upgrade ====
The gondola closed on 31 January 2023 due to reaching the end of its workable life. A proposed $105M redevelopment to create a more modern and fully accessible passenger experience, including larger gondolas capable of accommodating wheelchairs and prams, has been approved by the NSW Government following assessment. The project attracted community opposition, with concerns raised about the increased height and visual impact of pylons above the tree canopy, vegetation removal, and effects on harbour views, as well as the scale of associated infrastructure such as new stations and expanded queuing areas; Sydney Zoo also lodged an objection citing potential competitive impacts. The approved design retains the original route while reducing the number of pylons compared to the previous system and introducing new stations, landscaping and visitor facilities. Taronga Zoo stated the redevelopment is necessary to replace ageing infrastructure, improve access across the site's steep terrain, and includes tree replacement, environmental and heritage management measures. Construction is due to commence in early 2026 with it scheduled to re-open in 2027–2028.

== 2000 master plan ==
In 2000, TCSA commenced a 12-year $250 million master plan, the majority of which is being spent at Taronga Zoo. The first major master plan item was the Backyard to Bush precinct which opened in April 2003. Under the plan, the zoo received five Asian elephants from the Thailand Zoological Park Organisation for breeding purposes, education, long-term research and involvement of conservation programs. The plan has met opposition from environmental activists in Thailand, who blockaded the trucks hauling the elephants to Bangkok International Airport for their flight on 5 June 2006. The elephants along with other Asian rain forest specimens are housed in the Wild Asia precinct which opened in July 2005 (the elephants arriving from quarantine in November 2006) and aims to immerse visitors in an Asian rain forest environment (though later renamed Rainforest Trail as included species from tropical Africa).

A marine section, Great Southern Oceans, opened in April 2008. Recently, the redevelopment and restoration of the historic entrance opened, further adding to the masterplan. The chimpanzee exhibit also underwent expansion work and re-opened as Chimpanzee Sanctuary allowing its residents more space and also to assist making it easier for the introduction of new individuals by splitting the areas of the exhibit when necessary.

== 21st century upgrades ==
The Centenary Theatre is a 160-seat immersive cinema that opened in 2016 as part of the zoo's centenary celebrations. Designed with a curved timber façade and wrap-around screen, the theatre showcases wildlife conservation films throughout the day and hosts live presentations on weekends and school holidays.

The Tiger Trek precinct opened in August 2017, featuring multiple exhibits for critically endangered Sumatran tigers. Visitors experience an immersive simulation of travel to Sumatra, including a themed plane ride, a walk through a replica national park village and ranger station, and up-close viewing of the tiger habitats.

The Taronga Institute of Science and Learning was officially opened on 16 October 2018 by Prince Harry and Meghan Markle, Duke and Duchess of Sussex. The building, often referred to as “The Hive” due to its honeycomb-inspired architecture, serves as a centre for conservation education and scientific research. It brings together students, scientists, and educators, combining traditional classrooms with immersive, habitat-themed learning environments.

At its core are three immersive classrooms — Australian Desert, Rainforest, and Woodland — where students can learn alongside live animals such as bilbies, and cotton-top tamarins. The institute also includes a 250-seat lecture theatre, laboratories for behavioural ecology and wildlife health, and the CryoDiversity Bank, which preserves genetic material from endangered species. Outdoor learning spaces include enclosures for echidnas, kangaroos, and koalas.

The Taronga Wildlife Retreat opened in October 2019 as part of the zoo's broader Australian precinct redevelopment. The eco-accommodation offers rooms overlooking the red kangaroo exhibit and provides guests with guided access to native wildlife areas, including the Blue Mountains bushwalk trail and an outdoor platypus exhibit.

The African Savannah precinct opened in June 2020, redeveloping and expanding the zoo's previous giraffe and zebra habitats. The new design includes mixed-species exhibits, such as giraffes, ostriches, and zebras sharing the “Waterhole” enclosure, as well as new habitats for African lions, fennec foxes, and meerkats. The African lion habitat was temporarily closed in 2022 following an incident involving five cubs and their father escaping into a secondary containment area; no injuries occurred, and the enclosure reopened after a year of upgrades.

In 2023, the zoo opened the Nura Diya Australia precinct, following a five-year redevelopment of the former Australian Walkabout and Nocturnal House areas. The precinct complements the Taronga Wildlife Retreat, which opened nearby in 2019. The new Nocturnal House, Nightwing Nura, features bilbies, ghost bats, short-beaked echidnas, spinifex hopping mice; and J.R, who is presently the only Barton's long-beaked echidna to be living outside of his species' wild range in Papua, (and is over 55 years old now). It also includes a platypus named Matilda, she was named after the Australian national women's soccer team, who's nickname are The Matildas.

The open-air section offers elevated walkways and new viewing areas for koala encounters, along with ground-level walkthroughs featuring emus, kangaroos, and wallabies.

The Amphibian and Reptile Conservation Centre opened in June 2024, replacing the zoo's previous reptile exhibits. It houses more than 40 native and international species.

The new Taronga Wildlife Hospital is scheduled to open in 2027, replacing the zoo's previous behind-the-scenes veterinary spaces. Located on the former reptile exhibit site, the hospital will serve primarily Taronga's own animals but will also provide advanced surgical, rehabilitation, and quarantine facilities for wildlife from across New South Wales. Designed as a teaching hospital, it will offer hands-on training opportunities for veterinary and conservation students, and include public viewing windows to allow guests to observe animal care procedures.

=== Upcoming ===
The zoo has announced the following plans:

- Construction of a state-of-the-art new wildlife hospital
- New Sky Safari cable car scheduled to open in 2027–2028
- Possible acquirement of a Philippine crocodile is being considered
- Development of a tropical African rainforest precinct is being considered

== Education ==
The zoo collaborates with TAFE NSW and its Institute of Science and Learning to deliver training in conservation, animal care, and wildlife management, including nationally accredited Certificate II and III courses in Animal Care and Wildlife and Exhibited Animal Care, along with a range of short courses. In 2017, it partnered with the University of Sydney to establish the Bachelor of Science (Taronga Wildlife Conservation). A Master of Teaching program was also offered but has since concluded. The Institute of Science and Learning, known as "The Hive" for its beehive-inspired design, includes immersive classrooms representing Australian woodland, desert, and rainforest habitats, as well as traditional classrooms, offices, a lecture theatre, and outdoor learning spaces with echidnas, kangaroos, and koalas.

Taronga Zoo also delivers education programs for children and young people. Schools can visit for curriculum-based workshops led by zoo educators, and the overnight ZooSnooze program allows groups to stay on site and take part in after-hours learning experiences, and the ZooMobile allows animals to visit schools for incursions and educational sessions. The zoo also runs Zoo Adventures school holiday programs (ages 5–12), Keeper for a Day (Junior 8–12, Cadet 13–18, and Adult), and the Youth at the Zoo (YATZ) volunteer program (13–18).

== Volunteering ==
=== Adult Volunteer's ===
Taronga Zoo's Adult Volunteer Program involves over 600 volunteers working in more than 40 roles across its sites, including Zoo Keeper Volunteers and Guest Experience volunteers. Adult volunteers assist with animal care, preparing enrichment items, supporting keeper talks, guiding visitors handing out maps and way finding), and maintaining exhibit interpretation. Guest Experience volunteers act as ambassadors, greeting visitors, providing directions, outlining daily events and animal encounters, and communicating conservation messages.There are also volunteers in animal reporting and monitoring and enrichment making.

=== Youth Volunteer's ===
Launched in 1999, the Youth at the Zoo (YATZ) program engages young people aged 13 to 18 in conservation, education, and community activities. There are more than 450 active members who assist Taronga staff in conservation campaigns, education programs, guest experience, and animal husbandry.The program aims to encourage youth participation in conservation and inspire future careers in environmental and animal-related fields.

== Conservation ==
Taronga Zoo engages in a number of conservation efforts aimed at minimising human impact and ensuring ecological sustainability, working both in Australia and internationally.

=== Legacy Species ===
In 2016, the legacy commitment was launched, dedicating the next decade to the conservation of ten critical species, known as the Legacy Species. These species included five native to Australia, bilby, koala, marine turtles, platypus, regent honeyeater, and southern corroboree frog; as well as five that are on the brink of extinction in Sumatra; the Sumatran elephant, Sumatran rhinoceros, Sumatran tiger, sun bear, and Sunda pangolin.

== Notable events ==
=== Platypus birth ===
In February 2003, it became the second zoo in Australia to breed the platypus.

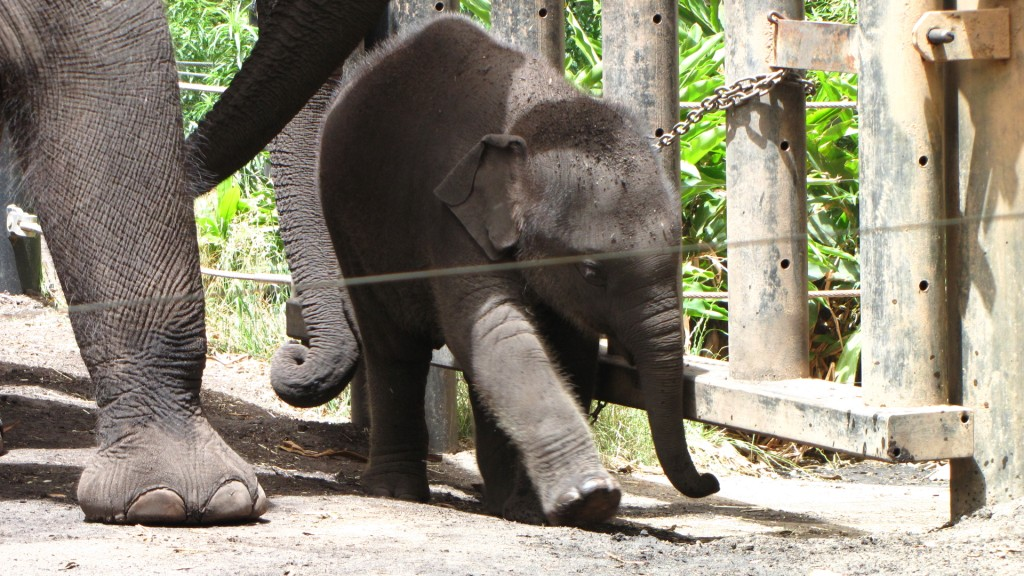
Luk Chai the Asian elephant at five months old

=== Australia's first elephant births ===
At 3.04 am on 4 July 2009, Thong Dee, an Asian elephant, gave birth to a male calf named Luk Chai. He is the first calf born in Australia. Thong Dee, and his father Gung, were two of the eight elephants imported into Australia to participate in the Australasian Conservation Breeding Program.

The baby elephant was a major tourist attraction, with thousands of visitors attending the zoo just to see him.

A second baby Asian elephant was thought to have died during labour on 8 March 2010. The calf's 18-year-old mother Porntip was in and out of labour over the week beforehand, after a pregnancy lasting almost two years.

Zoo keepers and veterinarians were concerned about the progress of the labour, with Porntip showing unusual movements and behaviour. An ultrasound revealed that the calf was unconscious in the birth canal, and the zoo announced on 8 March 2010 that the calf was believed to be dead. On 10 March 2010 at 3:27 am, the live male calf was born. He was subsequently named Pathi Harn, a Thai expression meaning "miracle". Pathi Harn's father is Bong Su, of the Melbourne Zoo, and was artificially conceived.

In October 2012, Pathi Harn critically injured his keeper by crushing her against a pole; the keeper survived.

The zoo's last two elephants, females Pak Boon and Tang Mo left in April 2025 to live at Monarto Safari Park to be joined by three elephants from Perth Zoo and Auckland Zoo there. Their former exhibit was then made into an exhibit called Rhino Reserve for Hari, the male greater one-horned rhinoceros, born at Taronga Western Plains Zoo, Dubbo in October 2021, and transferred from there in December 2025, and three water buffaloes as companions.

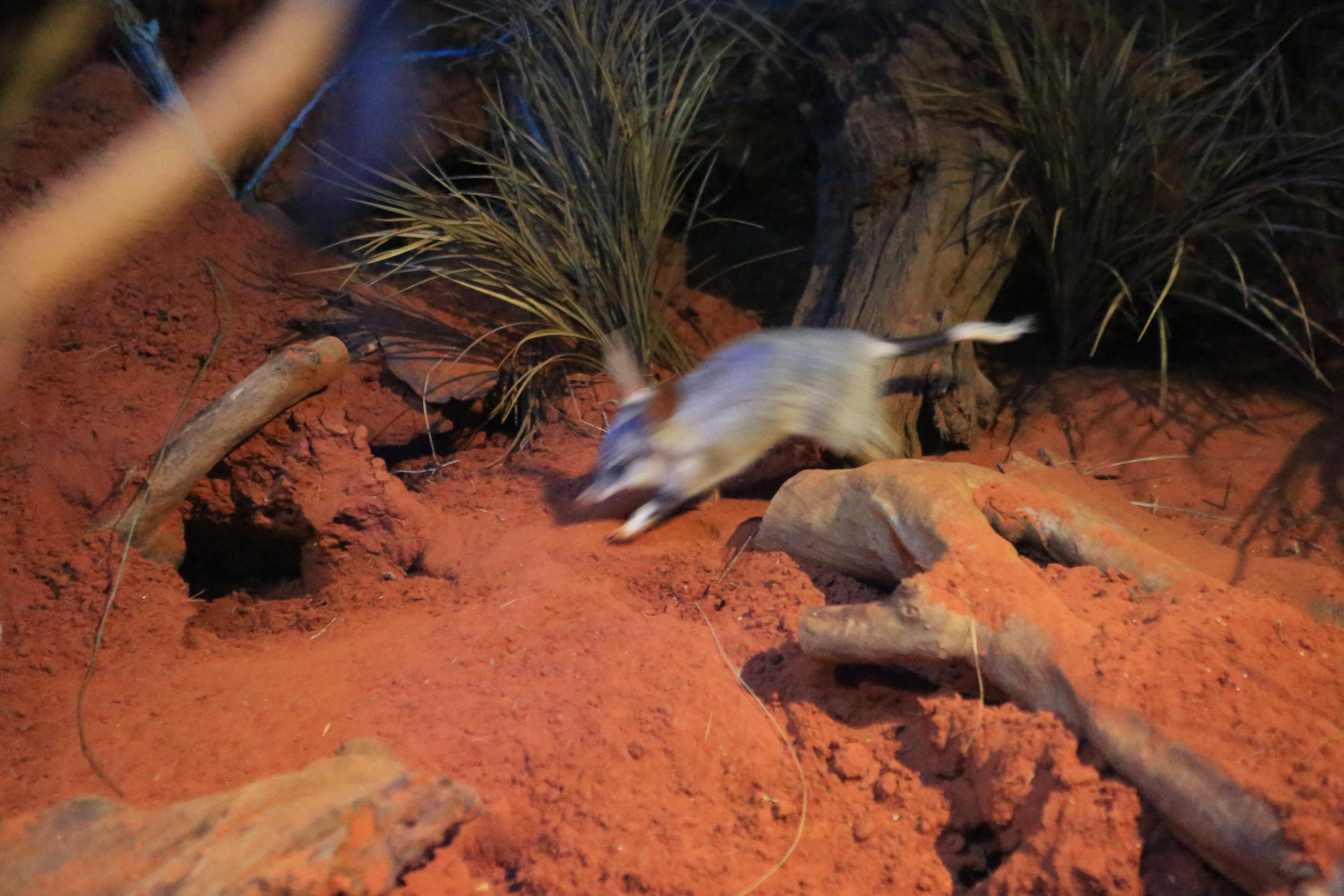
Bilby in zoos' Nguwing Nura nocturnal house

=== Royal tour ===
On 20 April 2014, Prince William and Catherine, Duchess of Cambridge (as they were), along with their 8-month-old son, Prince George, visited Taronga Zoo Sydney to participate in an unveiling ceremony at the bilby exhibit. The bilby was eventually renamed "Bilby George" in honour of the little prince who performed his first official duty. Later, William and Kate visited the zoo again without George meeting the other animals for Easter.

On 16 October 2018 their Royal Highnesses the Duke and Duchess of Sussex, Prince Harry and Meghan Markle visited the zoo, officially opened the Taronga Institute of Science & Learning at Taronga Zoo Sydney.

=== Birth of Sumatran tiger cubs ===
On 17 January 2019, Kartika, one of the zoo's four Sumatran tigers, gave birth to three cubs, two female cubs, Mawar and Tengah Malam and one male cub Pemanah. Sumatran tigers are critically endangered, with fewer than 350 individuals alive in the wild. In total, 21 tiger cubs have been born at Taronga since 1980.

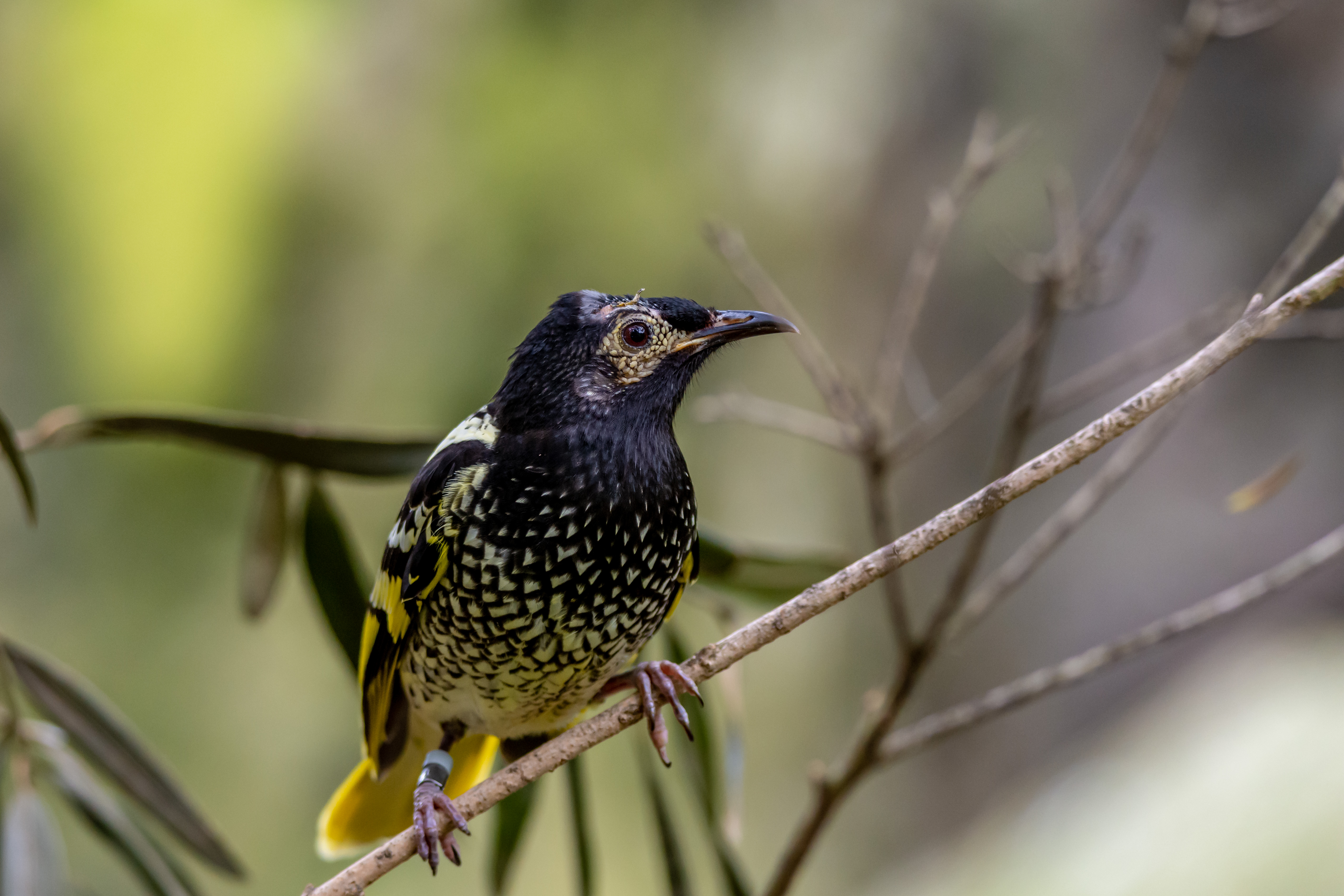
Regent honeyeater

=== Ongoing conservation work news ===
Taronga has been involved in numerous conservation captive breeding programs for endangered and vulnerable species for more than fifty years when the zoos management changed Taronga's trajectory away from general visitor entertainment to focus on assisting species that are threatened in their wild habitats.

For example, Taronga has been involved with the recovery program of the regent honeyeater for over 20 years. During that time they have bred and released over 200 of these birds into the wild, a significant contribution to their wild population. Taronga Zoo staff and volunteers have also helped with their habitat restoration by helping plant over 30000 trees in Capertee Valley.

=== African lion cubs ===
When the African Savannah precinct opened, two young brother African lions, Lwazi and Ato, marked the return of lions to Taronga Zoo Sydney after several years. An experienced lioness, Maya, was later introduced to the pride. She formed a bond with Ato, and in August 2021, gave birth to five cubs, Khari, Luzuko, Malika, Zuri, and Ayanna, the first litter of African lions born at the zoo in 18 years.

=== World's only leopard seals in a zoo in 21st century ===
Taronga Zoo was once home to the world's only leopard seals living in a zoo at the time (a few had been kept in captivity before elsewhere but was rare occurrence). Leopard seals are native to Antarctica but on rare occasions, will come up to Australia's coastlines during the late winter months. From 1999 - 2014 Taronga housed three different leopard seals, Brooke, Sabine (females) and Casey (male). All three were found separately washed up on beaches sick, malnourished or injured. As leopard seals are from the Antarctic, it was recommended that these seals not be returned to the wild once rehabilitated as they could potentially transfer unknown diseases to the fragile wild population and cause damage to the Antarctic ecosystem.

These three contributed to important research conducted by the Australian Marine Mammal Research Centre (AMMRC), bettering the understanding of this typically remote and lesser understood species. AMMRC conducted important scientific studies using these three as subjects, including leopard seal whisker growth rate, echolocation inaudible to the human ear and the suction and filter feeding that leopard seals use to hunt krill in the Antarctic.

An entire new enclosure was built to house the leopard seals, located in the new Great Southern Ocean Exhibit which opened to the public in 2008. This exhibit now houses Australian sea lions, Californian sea lions and New Zealand fur seals.

Brooke was the first to be rescued. In 1999 Brooke was found on Garie Beach in the Royal National Park. She was underweight, dehydrated and suffering from shark attack injuries. She was taken to Taronga Zoo for rehabilitation, keepers and veterinarians at Taronga were able to nurse Brooke back to health. She was unable to be released after this due to concerns that she harboured unknown diseases. Brooke was very popular with staff and visitors, being the first of her kind on display in the world. In 2008 Brooke suddenly became less active and started refusing food and it was believed that she was succumbing to an unknown infection; on 23 May 2008 she succumbed to Nocardiosis and died. It is not known exactly how old Brooke was as she was not born at the zoo, but she was believed to be around 10 years old at her death.

Sabine was the second leopard seal to come into Taronga's care, being found on Clontarf Beach in 2007, malnourished and on the brink of death with cookiecutter shark injuries. Sabine was nursed back to health by Taronga's keepers. The exact date of Sabine's death is unknown, though a 2011 article published by the zoo mentioned her as alive.

Taronga's final leopard seal Casey was found in 2007 a week after Sabine was found. Casey was found washed ashore at Wattamolla, south of Sydney in poor health with a recent cookiecutter shark wound on his abdomen. Like the other two leopard seals, Casey was also unable to be released back to the Antarctic and was kept at Taronga as a permanent resident. Casey was nursed back to health; once the Great Southern Ocean exhibit opened in 2008 he and Sabine were moved there together, with Brooke dying months before it opened. Taronga Zoo hoped to encourage Casey and Sabine to mate, having the first leopard seal pup born in a zoo, but Casey was so young when he was found stranded that he never learnt his mating call. Taronga played the mating calls of mature male leopard seals for Casey in hopes that he would learn them, but Sabine died before he could learn them. In 2014 Casey's health and condition began to decline. Despite Taronga marine mammal and veterinary teams' efforts to help him Casey showed no signs of recovery. On 20 February 2014 the decision was made to euthanize him.

== Transport ==
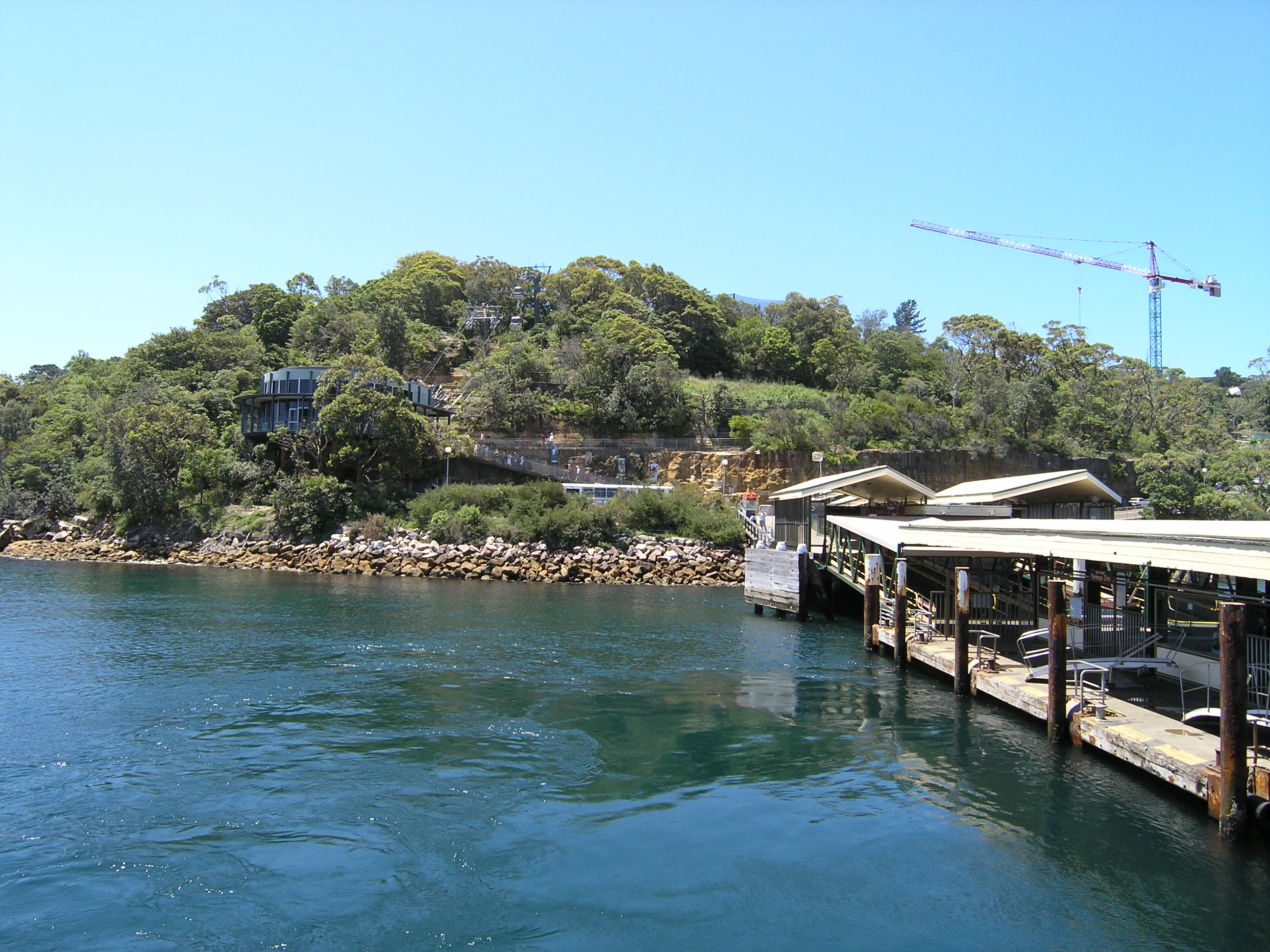
Taronga Zoo ferry wharf

The Taronga Zoo ferry services are, for many tourists, the preferred mode of travel to the zoo, providing a 12-minute ride from the city's Circular Quay to the zoo. Passengers disembarking at Taronga Zoo ferry wharf, located on Bradleys Head Road, can enter the zoo via its lower entrance. Local Keolis Northern Beaches bus route 100 from the city's QVB, terminates at the top entrance, while route 238, from Balmoral Beach, connects both top and lower entrances.

Taronga Zoo Sydney also works with various other Sydney Harbour transport operators, such as Captain Cook Cruises and Yellow Water Taxis. Both of these operators offer combined tickets/packages which include tickets covering transport fares and zoo entry.

=== Waste management ===
The zoo also focuses on minimising waste, diverting 84% of waste away from landfill and towards 20 different waste streams. One main focus is on single use plastics, encouraging reusable bags, water bottles, and coffee cups on site, and distributing biodegradable bags and food packaging. As part of the Seal talk and demonstration, the zoo encourages sustainable seafood choice through the MSC label.

== Incidents ==
=== 2022 lion escape ===
On the morning of 2 November 2022 at 6.40am, five African lions including 4 cubs and their father escaped their enclosure. None made it past the secondary fence. Police officers were called to the zoo at around 7.00am, and no injuries were reported. The lions were returned to their enclosure with one cub tranquilized. On 1 December 2022, the ABC published CCTV footage, obtained in a Government Information Public Access request, that shows the lions escaping through a hole in a fence.

== Exhibits and wildlife collection ==
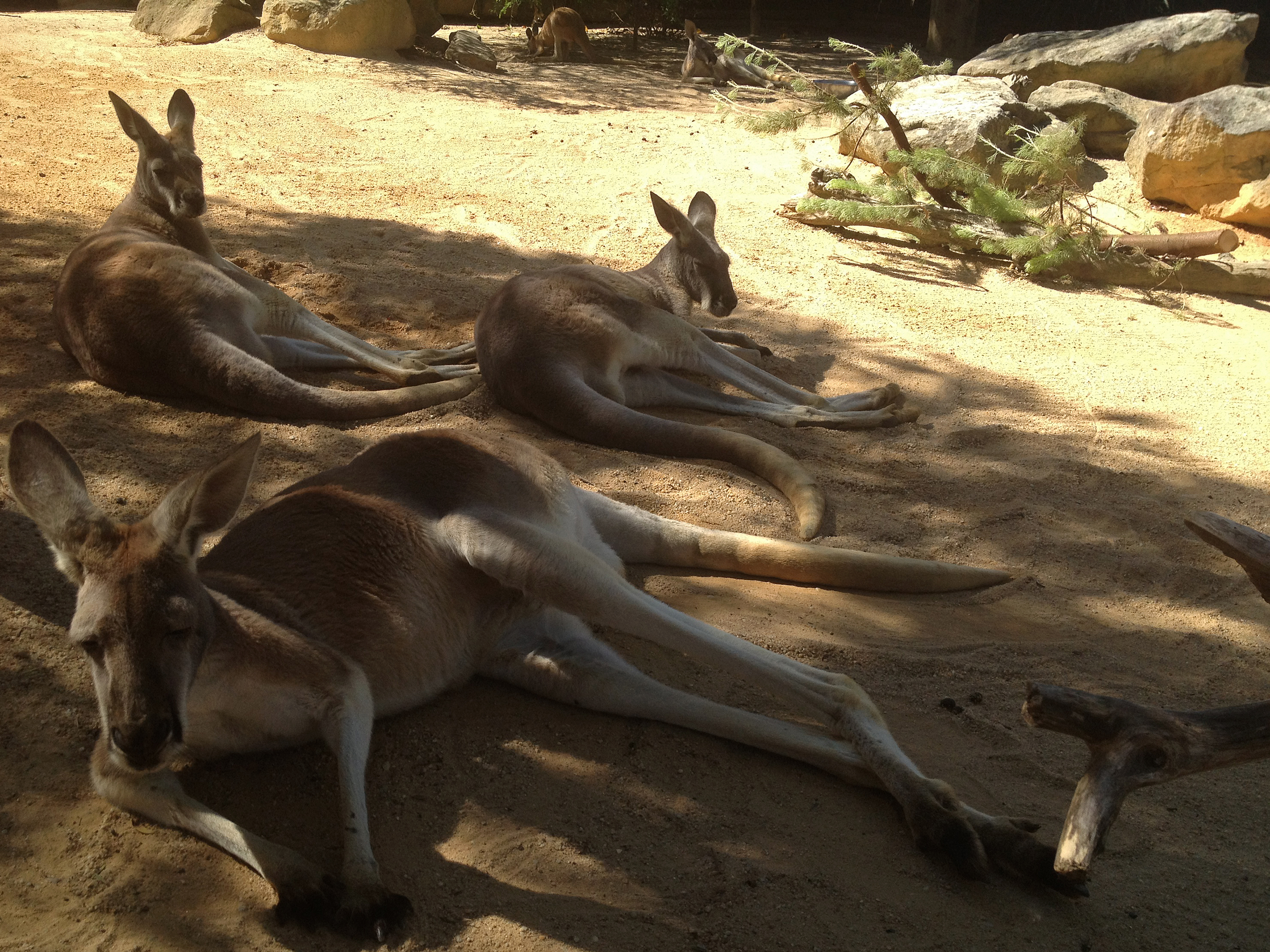
Red kangaroos in walkthrough exhibit

Taronga Zoo Sydney cares for approximately 5,000 animals from over 350 different species, many of which are threatened. They are housed in a large variety of exhibits, including:

=== Wild Australia ===
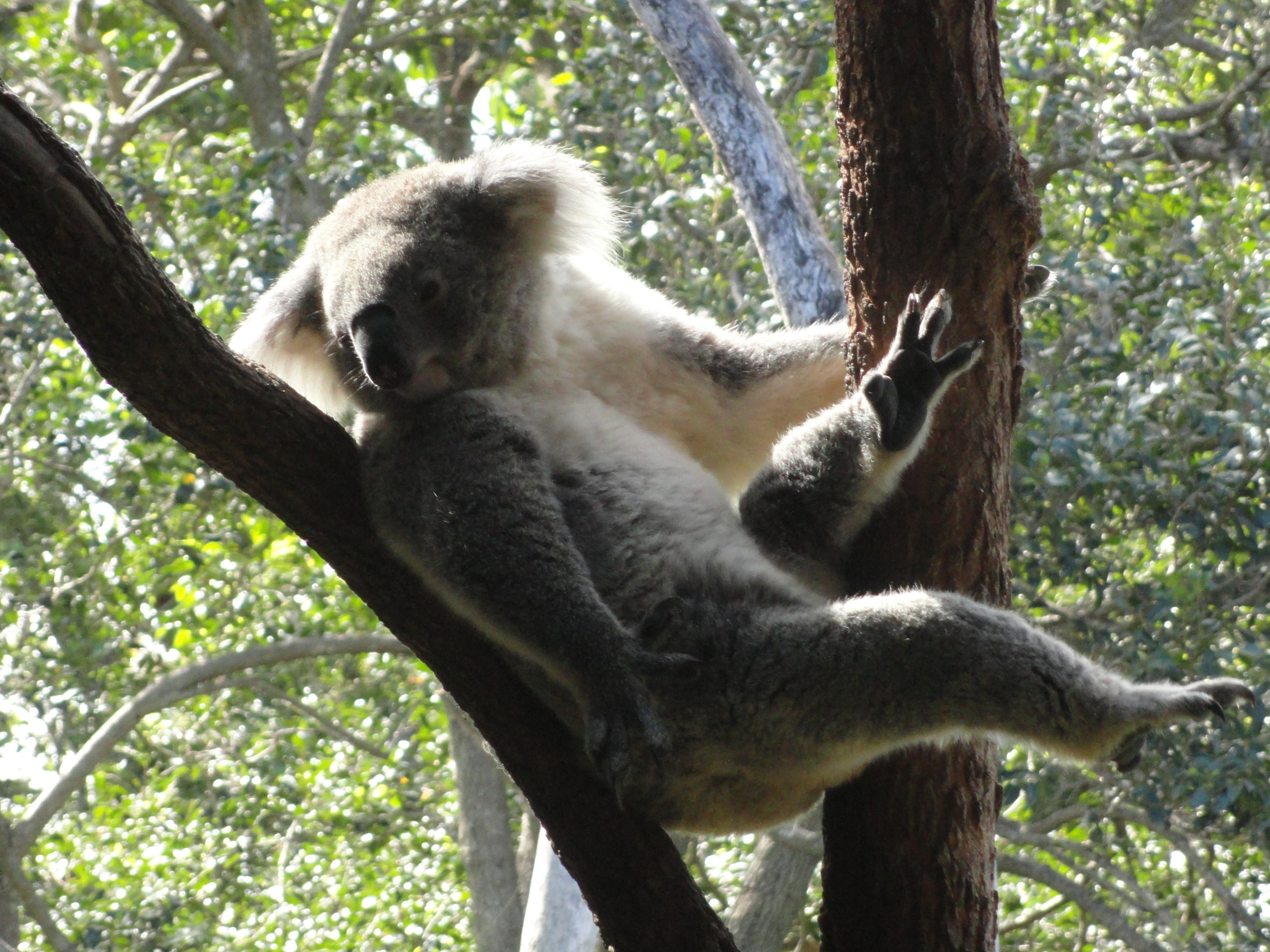
Koala

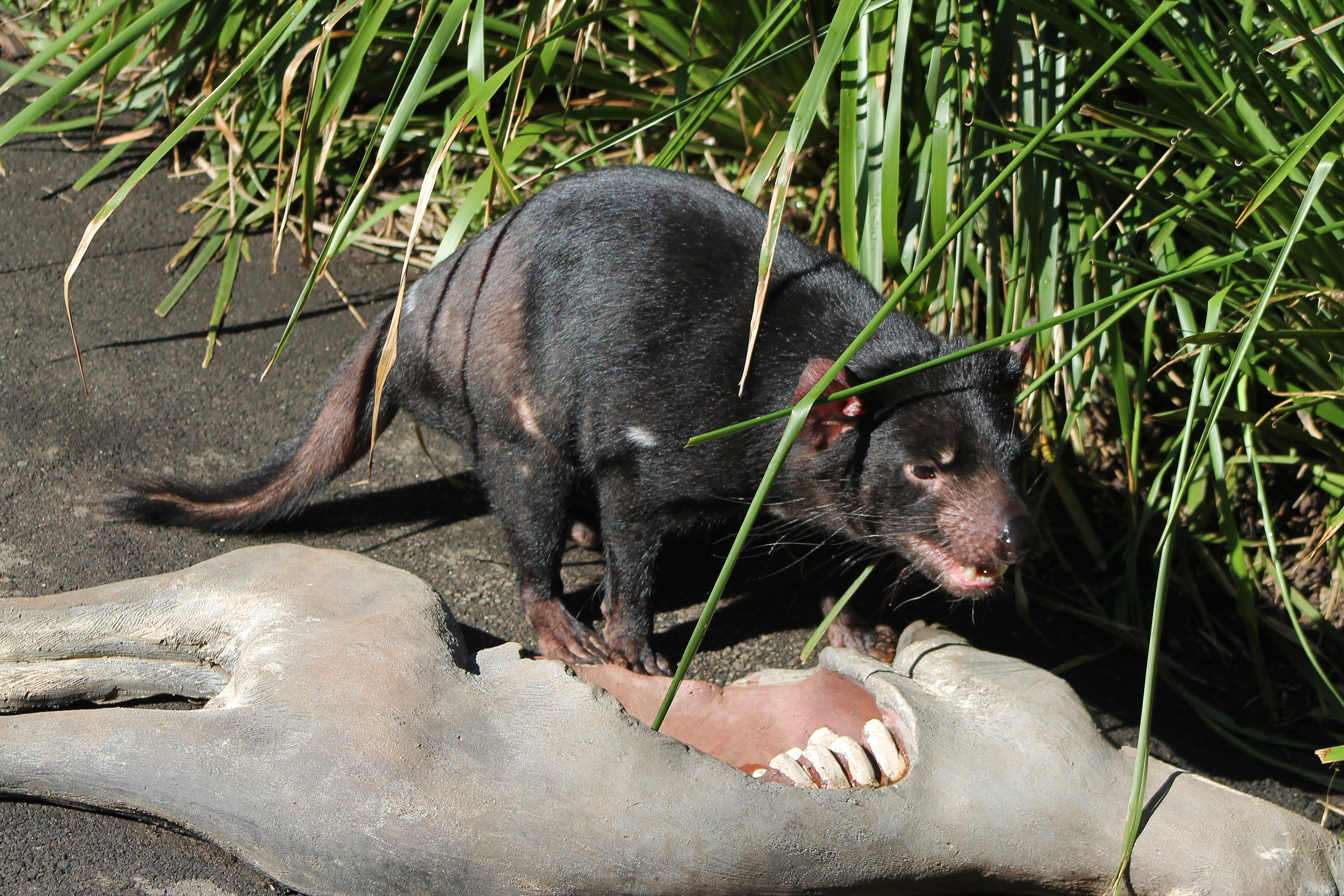
Tasmanian devil in exhibit with mock highway and foodbowl shaped as roadkill wallaby

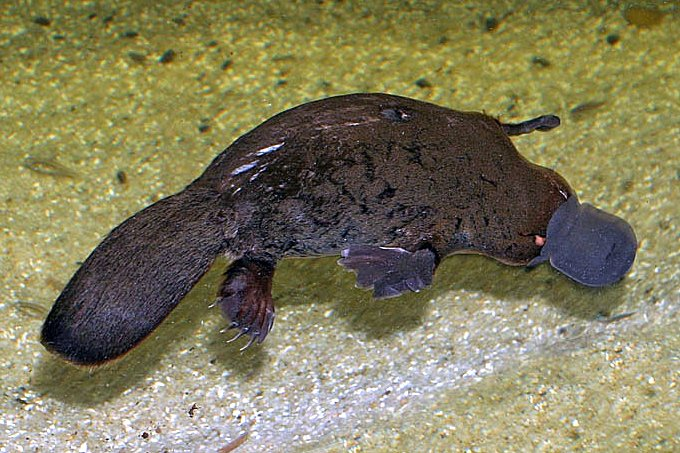
Platypus

==== Nura Diya Australia ====
Buru Nura (Kangaroo Country)

- Emu
- Kangaroo Island kangaroo
- Red kangaroo
- Red-necked pademelon
- Red-necked wallaby
- Swamp wallaby
- Tammar wallaby

Gulamanu Nura (Koala Country)

- Koala
- Short-beaked echidna

Wuragal Nura (Dingo Country)

- Dingo

==== Turtle Pool ====
- Short-necked turtle

==== Koala Walkabout ====
- Koala

==== Tasmanian Devil Conservation Centre ====
- Tasmanian devil

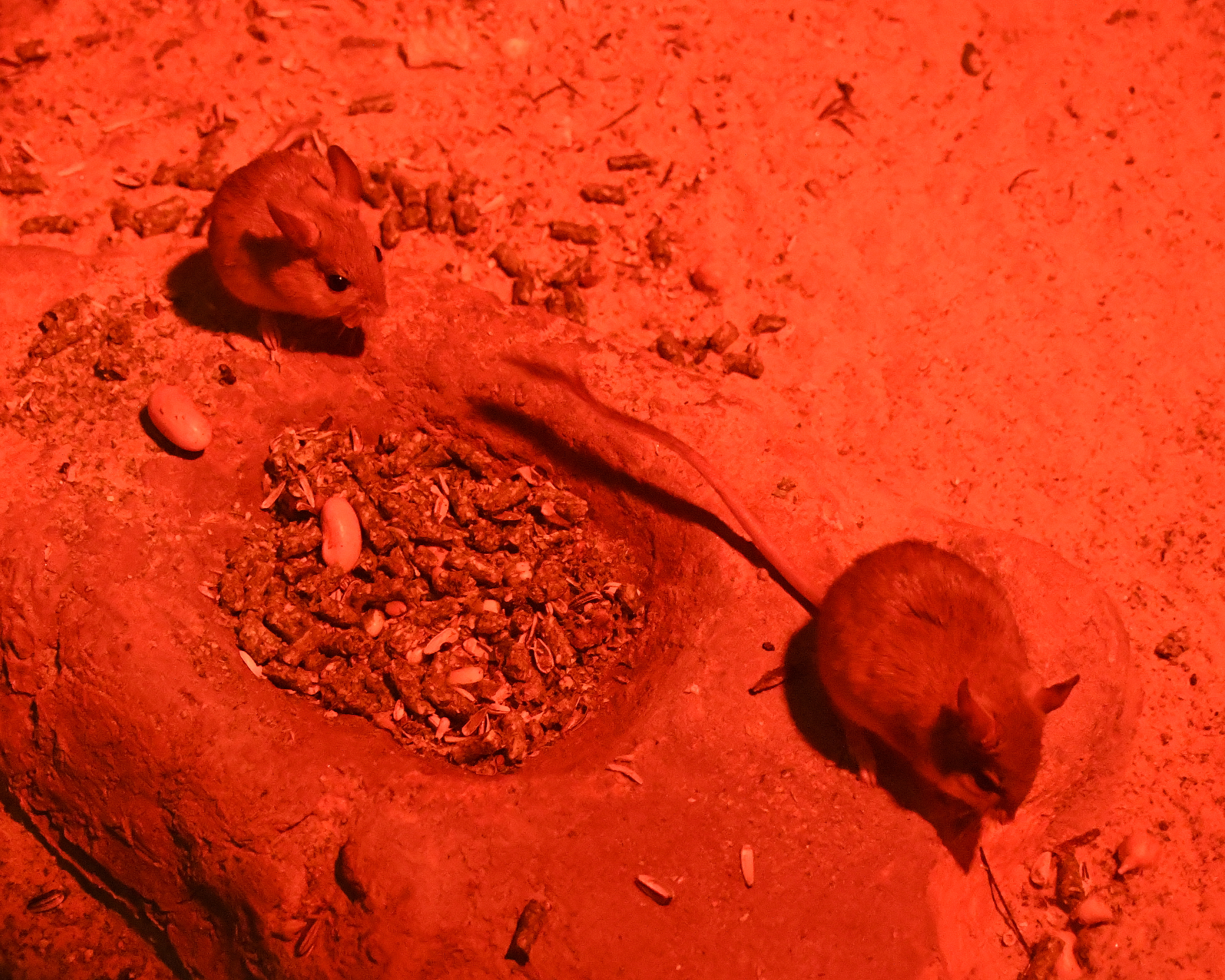
Spinifex hopping mice

==== Nguwing Nura (Nocturnal Country) ====
- Barton's long-beaked echidna
- Bilby
- Chuditch
- Fat-tailed dunnart
- Feathertail glider
- Ghost bat
- Long-nosed potoroo
- Platypus
- Rufous bettong
- Short-beaked echidna
- Spinifex hopping-mouse
- Yellow-bellied glider

==== Frogs ====
- Northern corroboree frog
- Southern corroboree frog

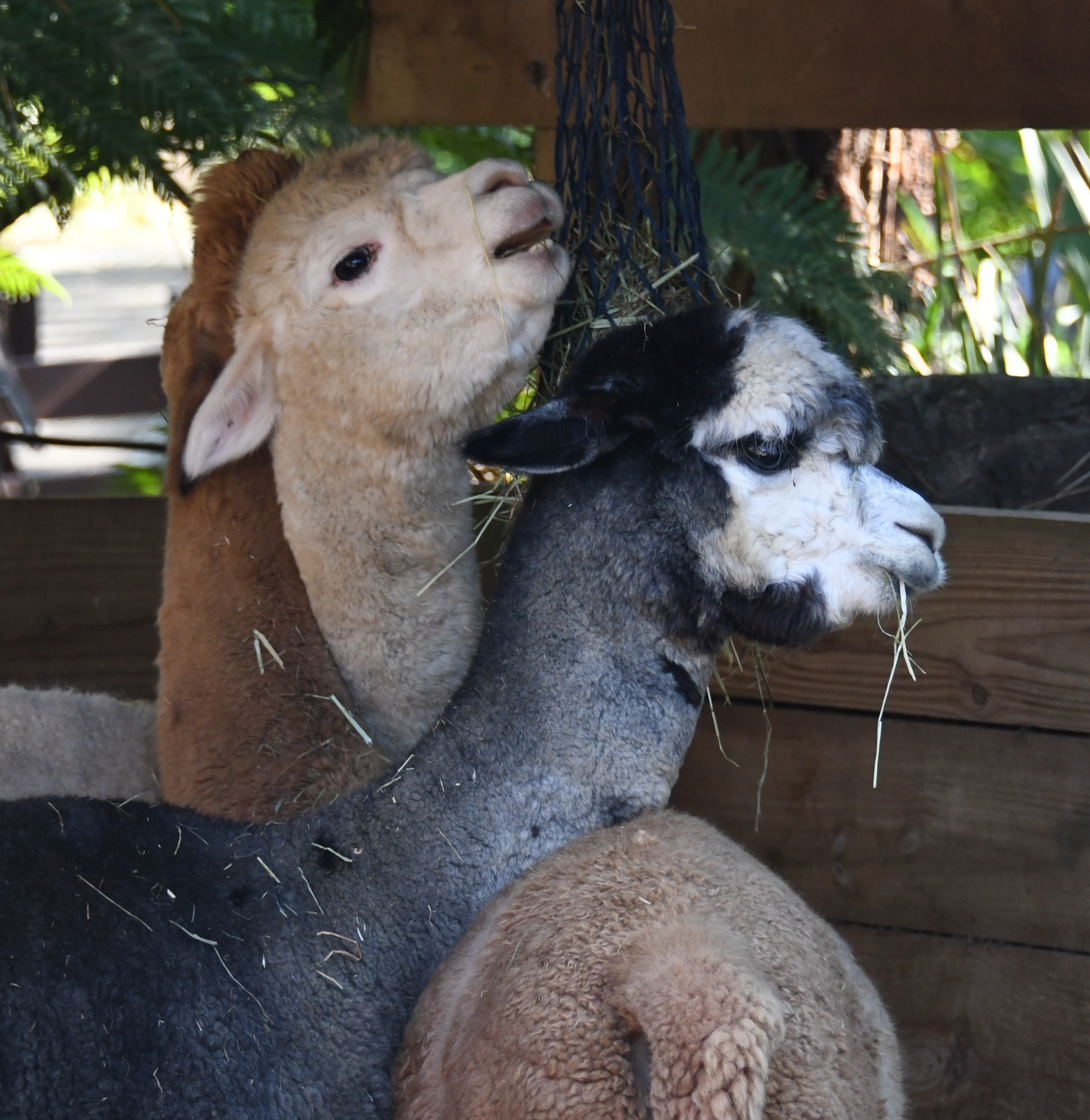
Alpacas in the Backyard to Bush farmyard

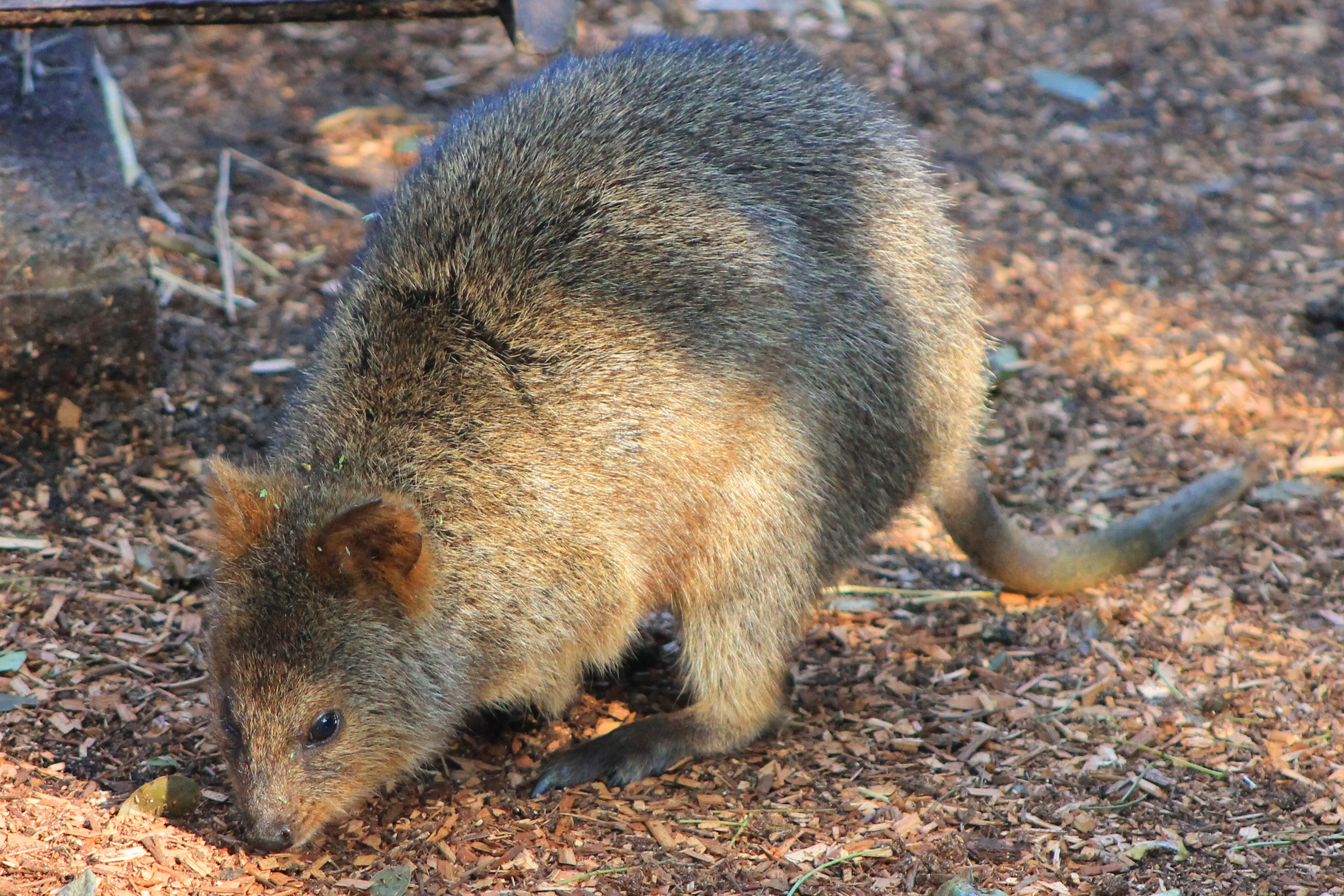
Quokka

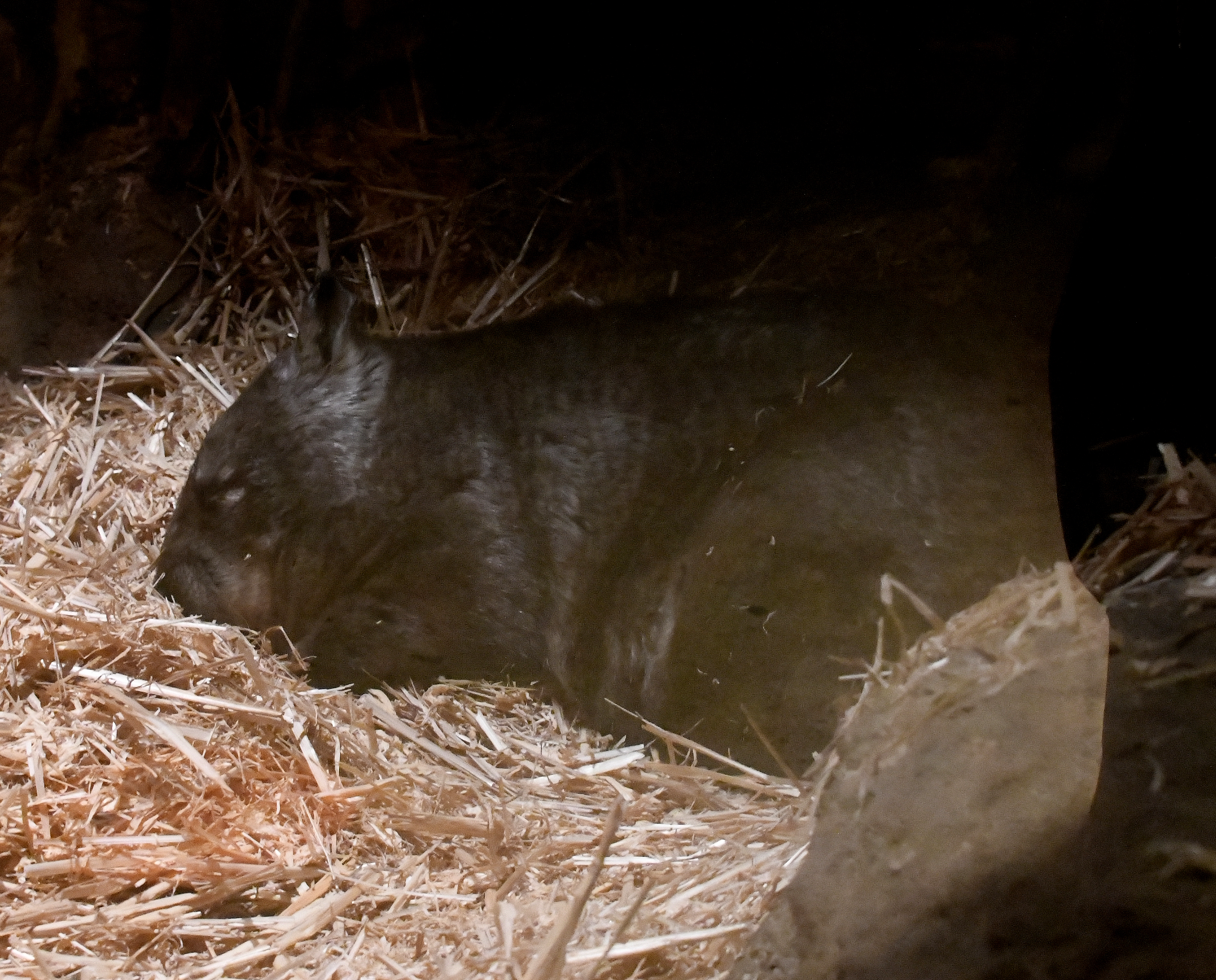
Southern hairy-nosed wombat (seen in burrow tunnel viewing)

==== Backyard to Bush ====
(House)

- Black house spider
- Children's python
- Children's stick insect
- Crowned stick insect
- Giant golden silk orb-weaver spider
- Goliath stick insect
- Praying mantis
- Redback spider
- Spiny leaf insect
- St Andrew's cross orb-weaver spider
- Sydney banded huntsman spider

(Backyard)

- Budgerigar
- Domestic rabbit
- Eastern blue tongue lizard
- Guinea pig
- Java sparrow
- King quail

(Farmyard)

- Alpaca
- Centralian carpet python
- Communal huntsman spider
- Cunningham's spiny-tailed skink
- Goat
- House mouse
- Silkie chicken
- Spinifex hopping mouse
- Western honey bee
- Western shingleback lizard

(Bush)

- Australian white sheep
- Mediterranean donkey/Sardinian Donkey
- Emu
- Quokka
- Short-beaked echidna

(Wombat Burrow Tunnel)

- Barking tarantula
- Flinders Range scorpion
- Giant burrowing cockroach
- Giant rainforest snail
- Southern hairy-nosed wombat
- Spinifex hopping-mouse
- Sydney funnel-web spider

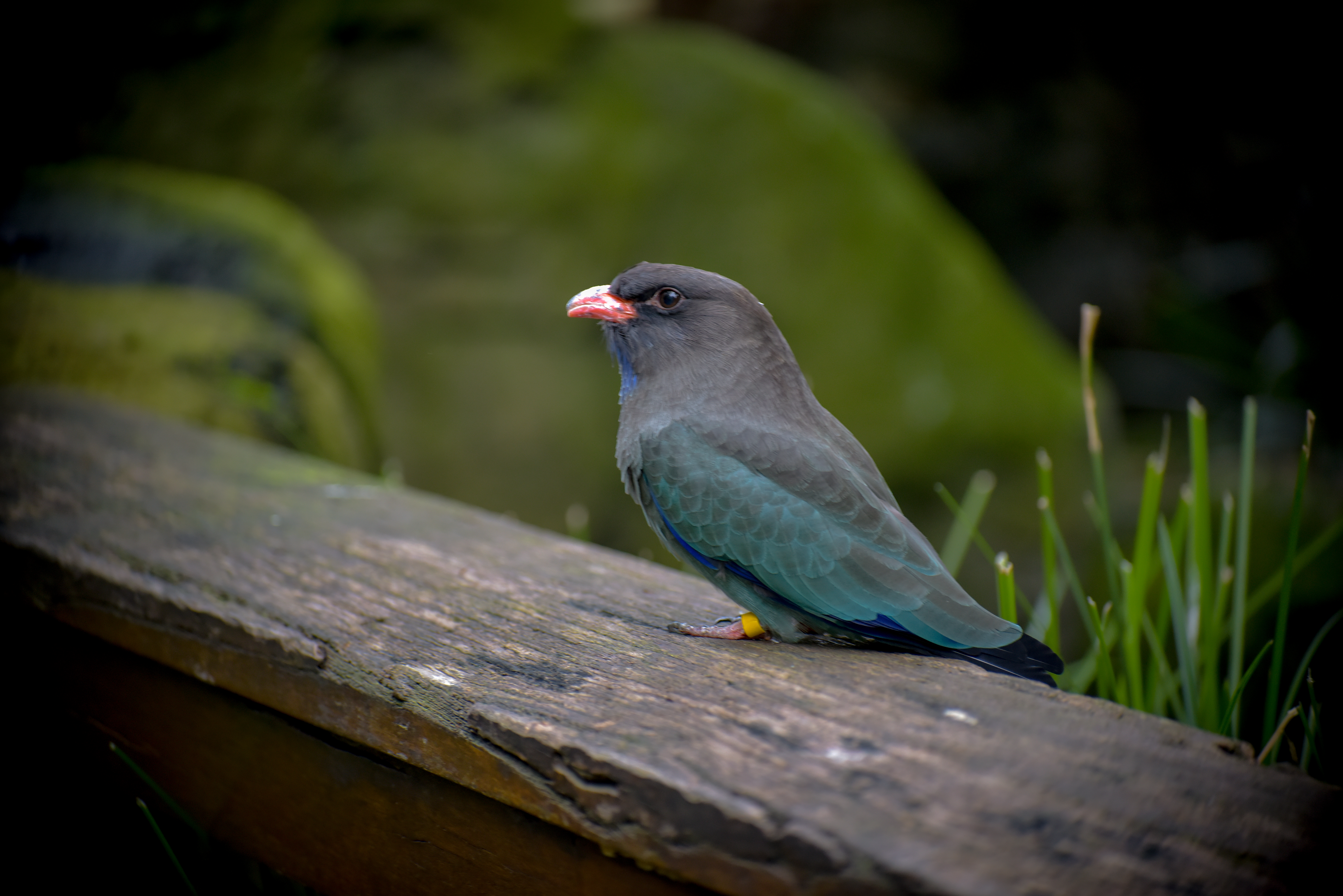
Dollarbird

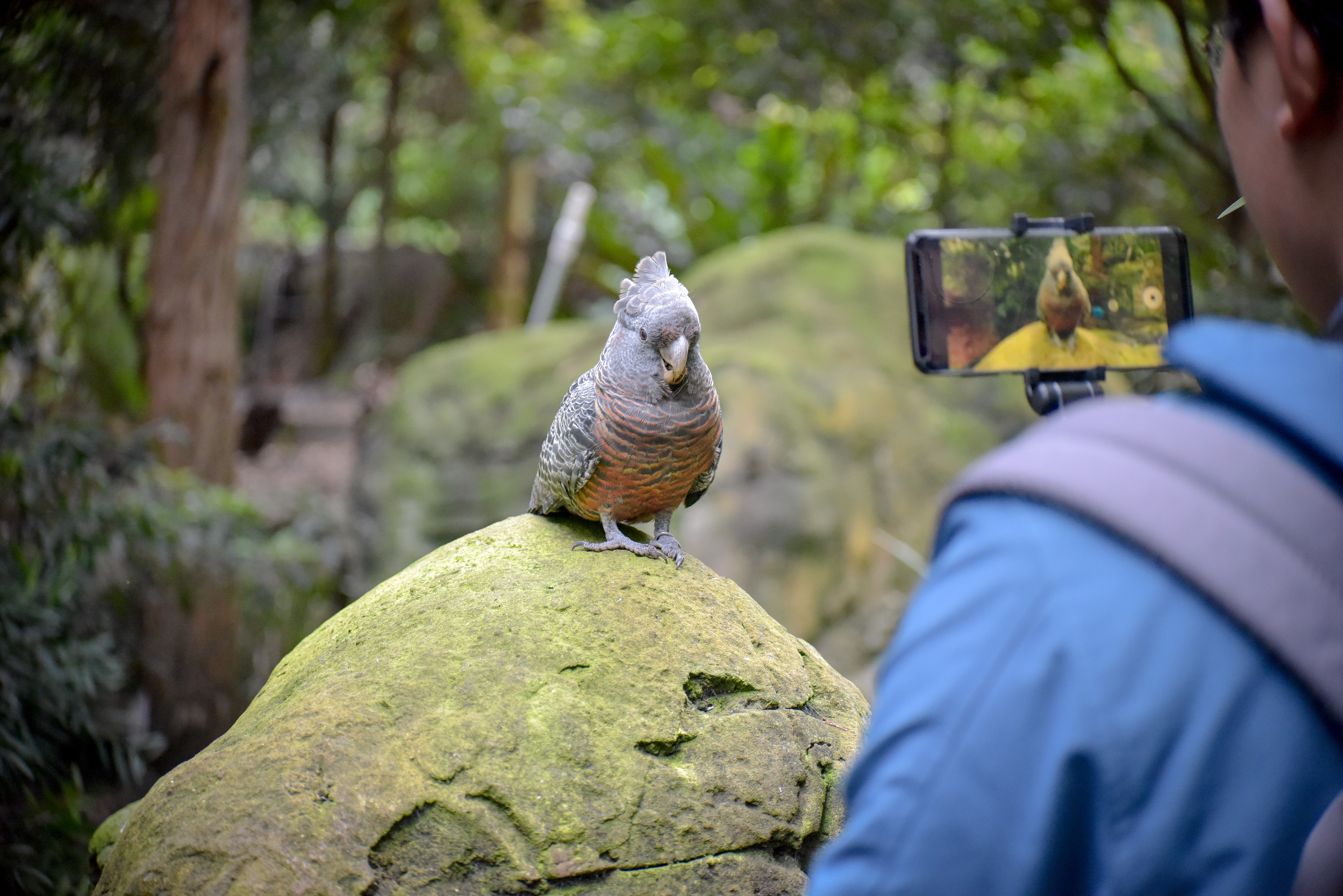
Gang-gang cockatoo being photographed in Blue Mountains Bushwalk aviary

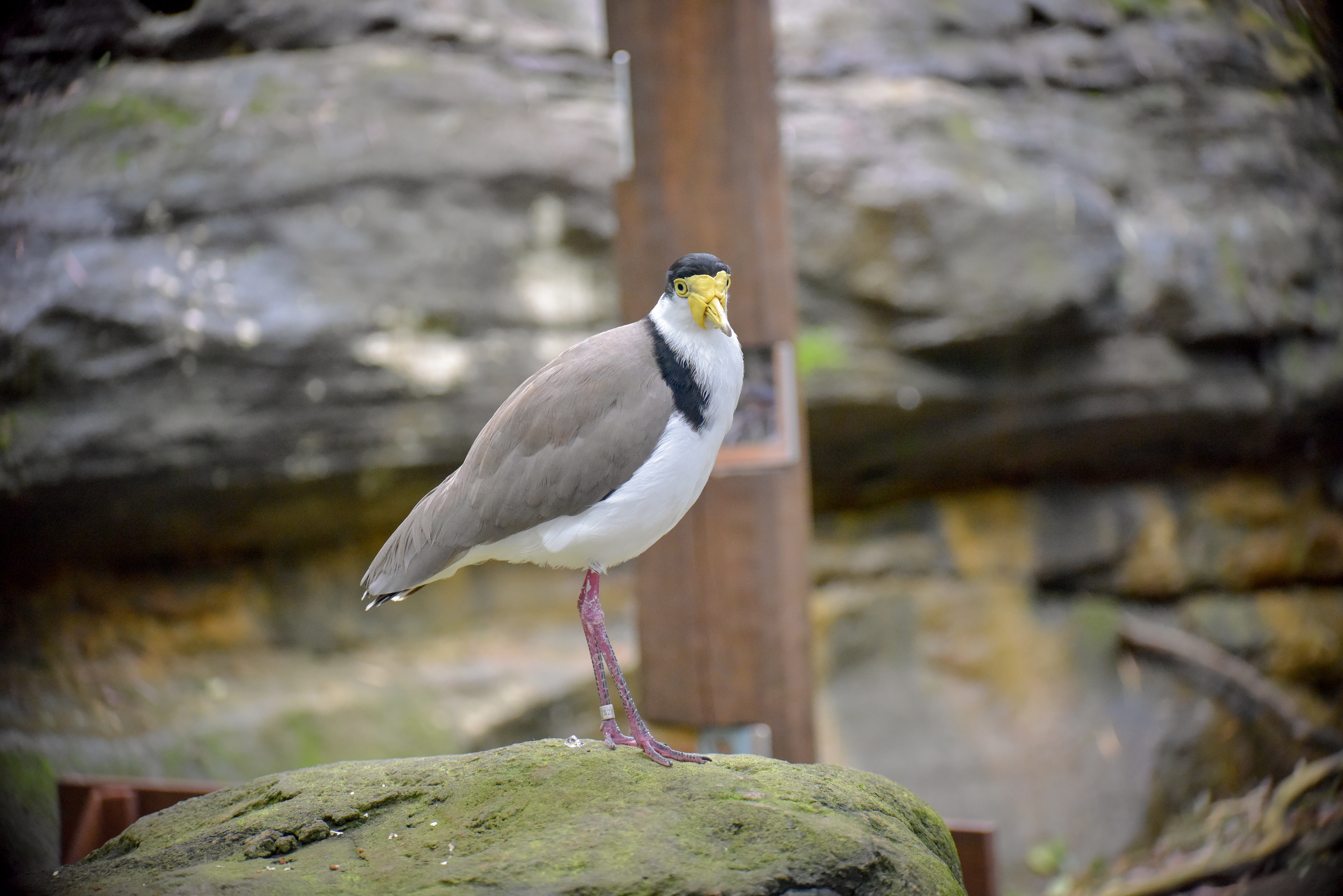
Masked lapwing

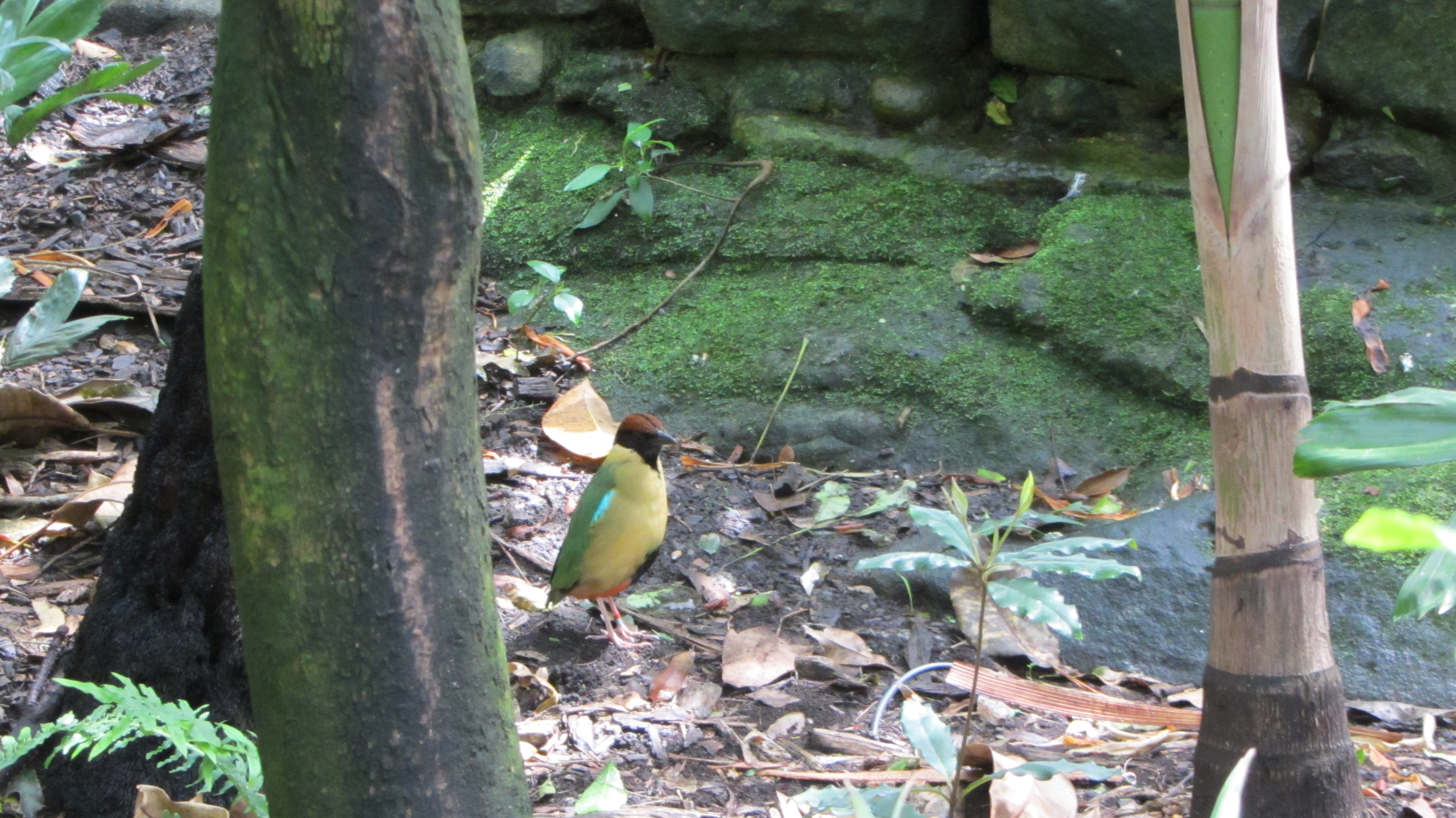
Noisy pitta in Blue Mountains Bushwalk aviary

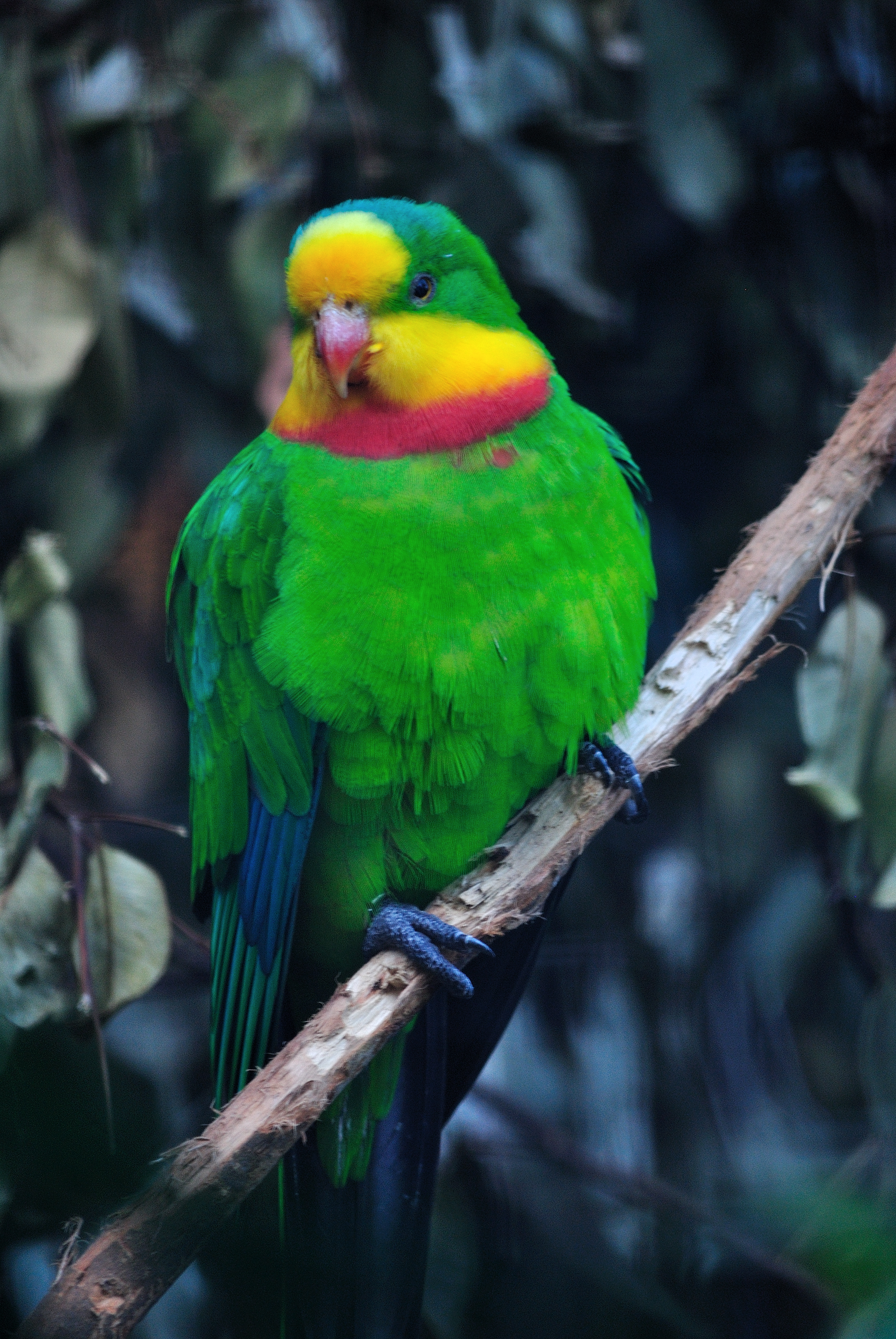
Superb parrot

==== Blue Mountains Bushwalk ====
- Australian king parrot
- Australian zebra finch
- Blue-billed duck
- Brown cuckoo dove
- Brush-tailed rock wallaby
- Budgerigar
- Bush bronzewing
- Bush stone-curlew
- Chestnut-breasted mannikin
- Common bronzewing
- Crested pigeon
- Cunningham's spiny-tailed skink
- Diamond firetail
- Dollarbird
- Eastern water dragon
- Eastern whipbird
- Freckled duck
- Gang-gang cockatoo
- Glossy black cockatoo
- Little lorikeet
- Masked lapwing
- Masked woodswallow
- Noisy pitta
- Pacific emerald dove
- Peaceful dove
- Platypus
- Plumed whistling duck
- Rainbow bee-eater
- Red-rumped parrot
- Regent bowerbird
- Regent honeyeater
- Rose-crowned fruit dove
- Sacred kingfisher
- Scaly-breasted lorikeet
- Striped honeyeater
- Superb lyrebird
- Superb parrot
- Swift parrot
- Welcome swallow
- White-browed woodswallow
- Wonga pigeon

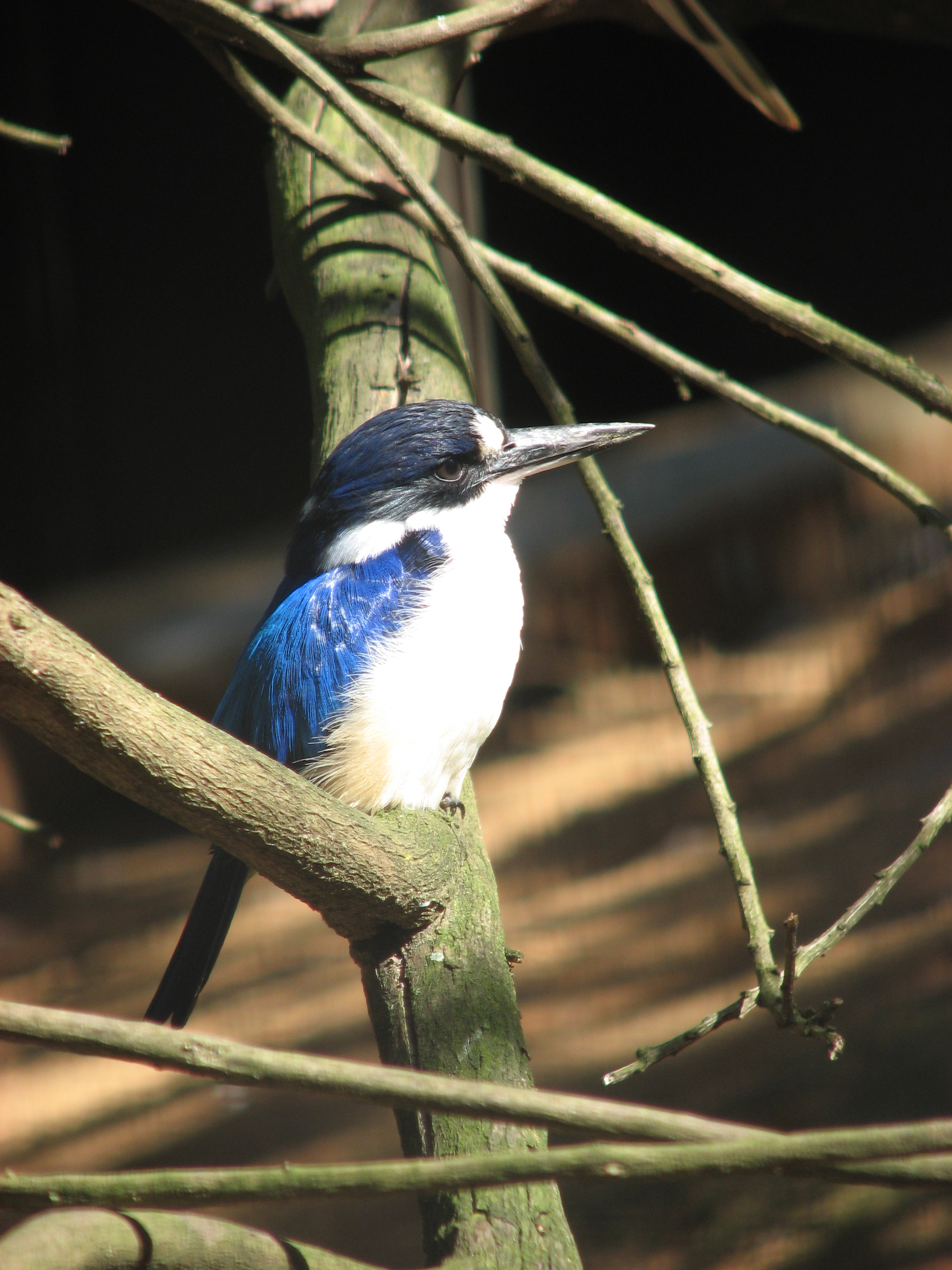
Forest kingfisher

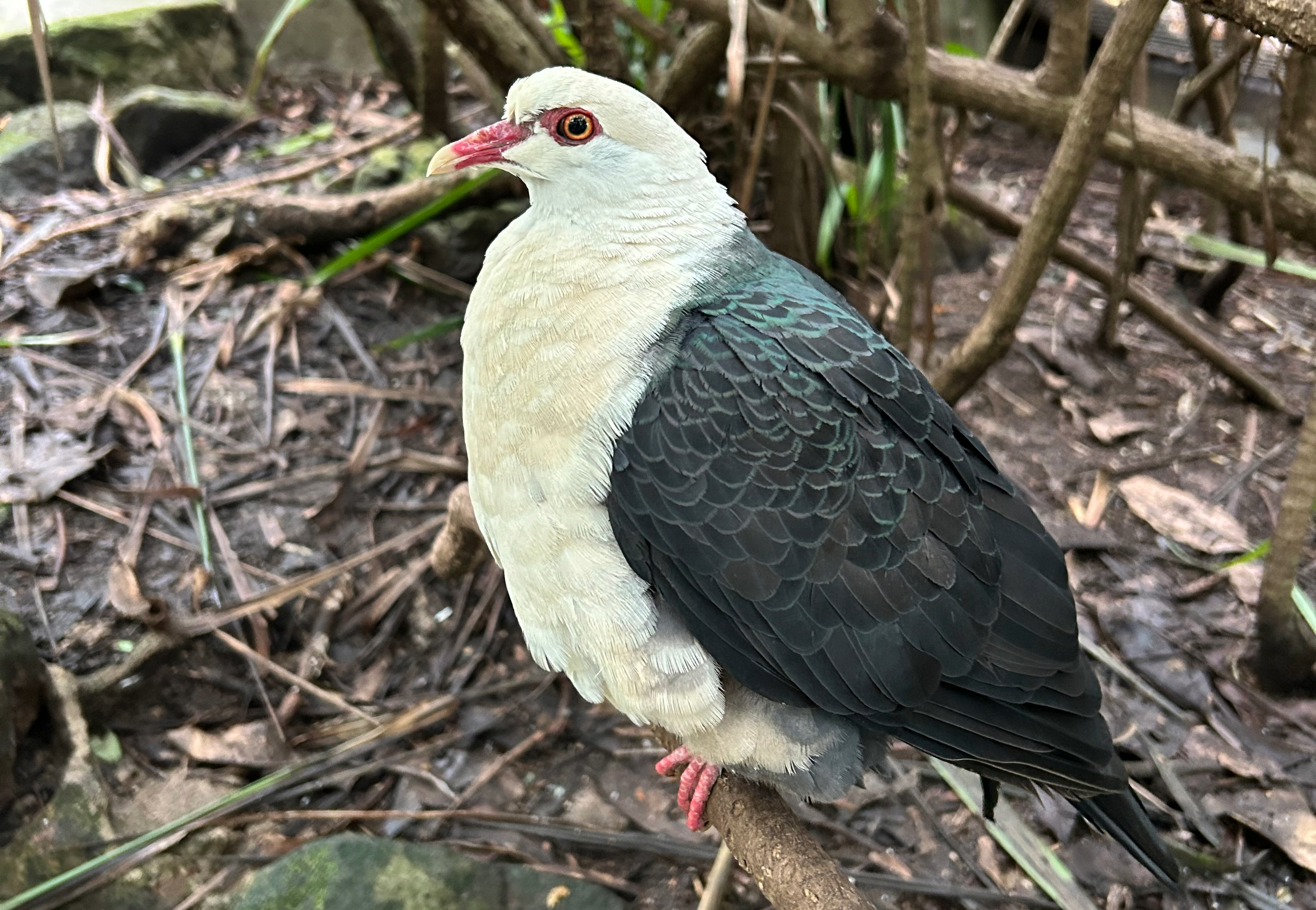
White-headed pigeon

==== Australian Rainforest Aviary ====
- Black-faced monarch
- Blue-faced parrot-finch
- Brown cuckoo dove
- Double-eyed fig-parrot
- Eastern whipbird
- Eclectus parrot
- Forest kingfisher
- Golden whistler
- Macleay's fig parrot
- Metallic starling
- Musk lorikeet
- Noisy pitta
- Pacific emerald dove
- Regent bowerbird
- Rose-crowned fruit dove
- Superb fruit dove
- Topknot pigeon
- Torresian imperial pigeon
- White-headed pigeon
- Wompoo fruit-dove

==== Semi-Arid Aviary ====
- Common bronzewing
- Diamond firetail
- Double-barred finch
- Eastern yellow robin
- Freckled duck
- King quail
- Little lorikeet
- Masked woodswallow
- Mulga parrot
- Rainbow bee-eater
- Red-headed honeyeater
- Silvereye
- Splendid fairywren
- Sugarbag bee
- Swift parrot
- Turquoise parrot
- Welcome swallow
- White-breasted woodswallow

=== Finch Aviary ===
- Clamorous reed warbler
- Crimson finch
- Forest kingfisher
- Gouldian finch
- Masked finch
- Mulga parrot
- Pied stilt
- Purple-backed fairywren
- Rufous whistler
- Stubble quail
- Variegated fairywren

==== Other Australian Birds ====
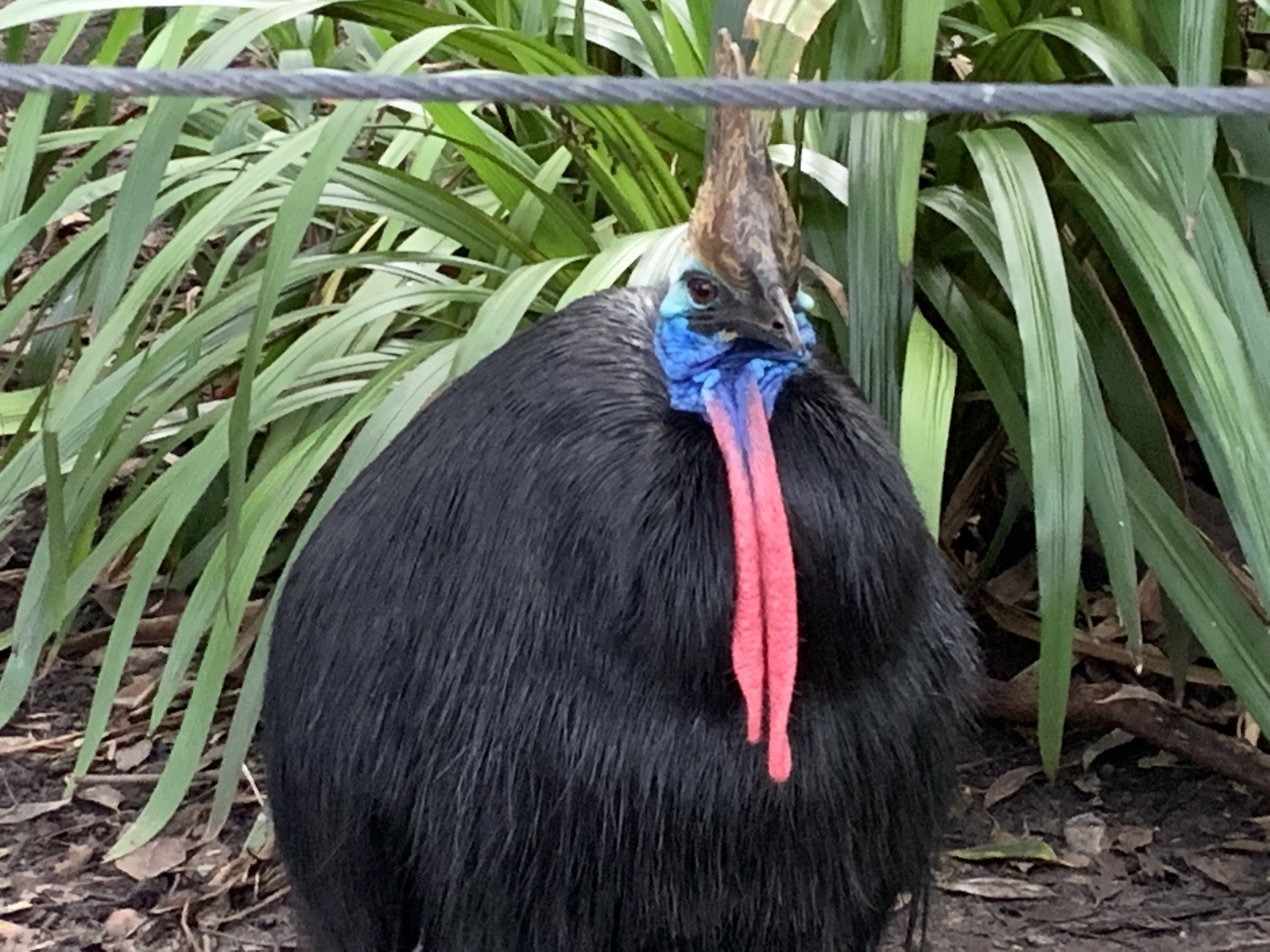
Southern cassowary

- Australian reed-warbler
- Barking owl ('Free Flight' bird show)
- Black-breasted buzzard ('Free Flight' bird show)
- Bush stone-curlew ('Free Flight' bird show)
- Lesser sooty owl ('Aussie Animals Alive' show)
- Red-tailed black cockatoo ('Free Flight' bird show)
- Southern cassowary
- Spinifex pigeon
- Star finch
- Sulphur-crested cockatoo ('Free Flight' bird show and free roaming)

=== Great Southern Oceans ===
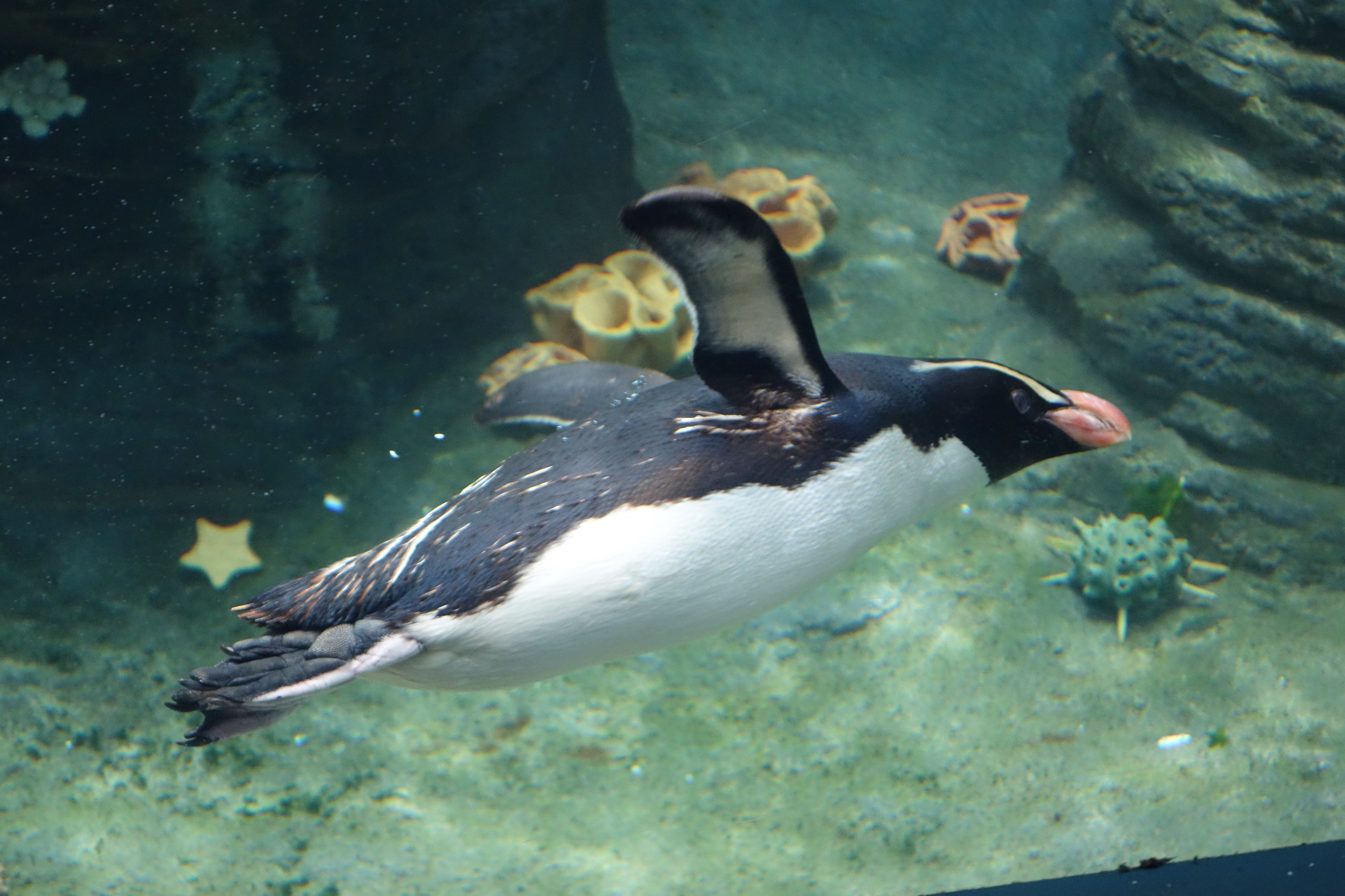
Fiordland penguin seen through underwater viewing

- Australian pelican
- Australian sea lion
- California sea lion
- Fiordland penguin
- Little penguin
- Long-nosed fur seal
- Port Jackson shark

=== Amphibian & Reptile Conservation Centre ===
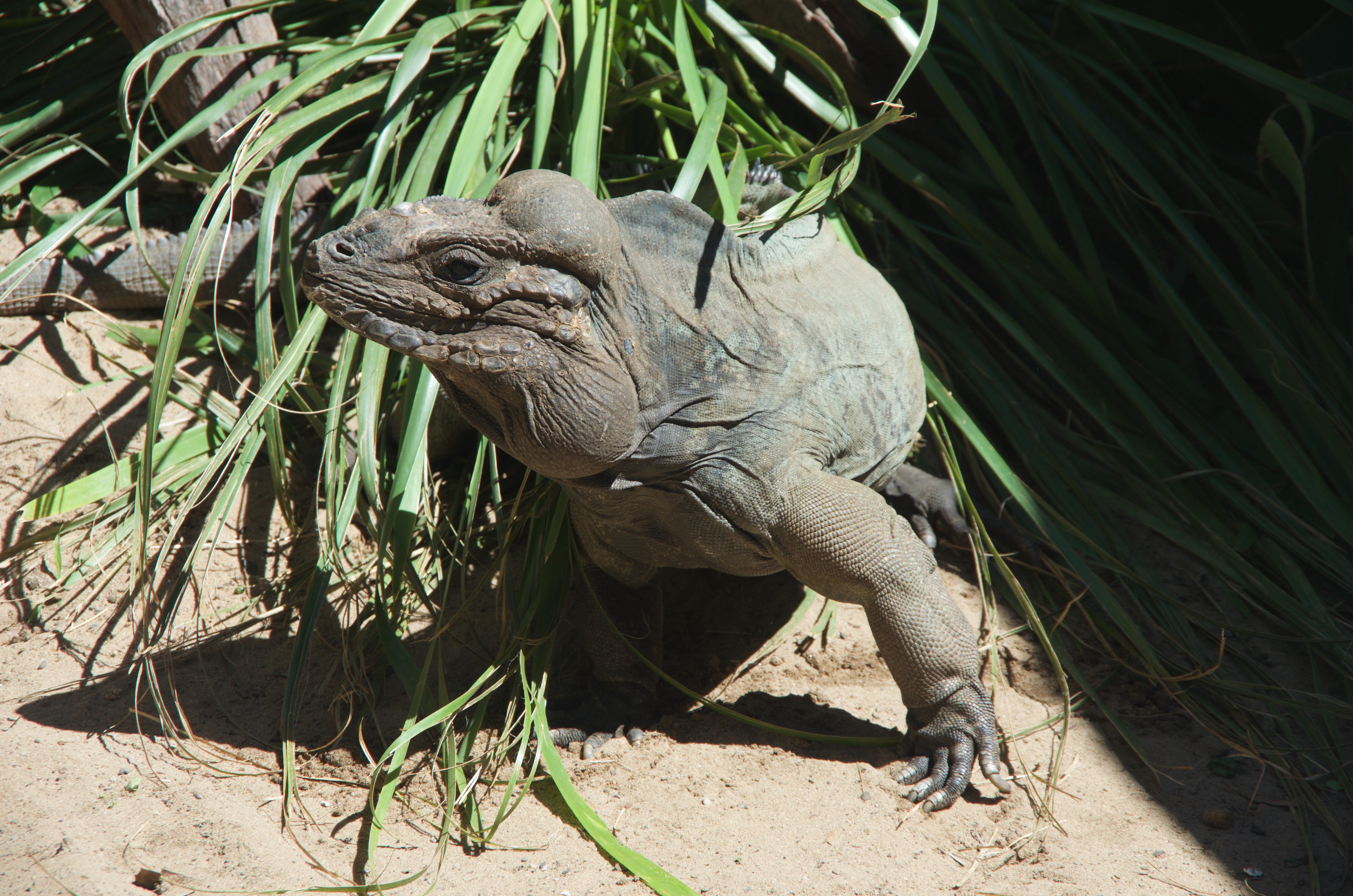
Rhinoceros iguana

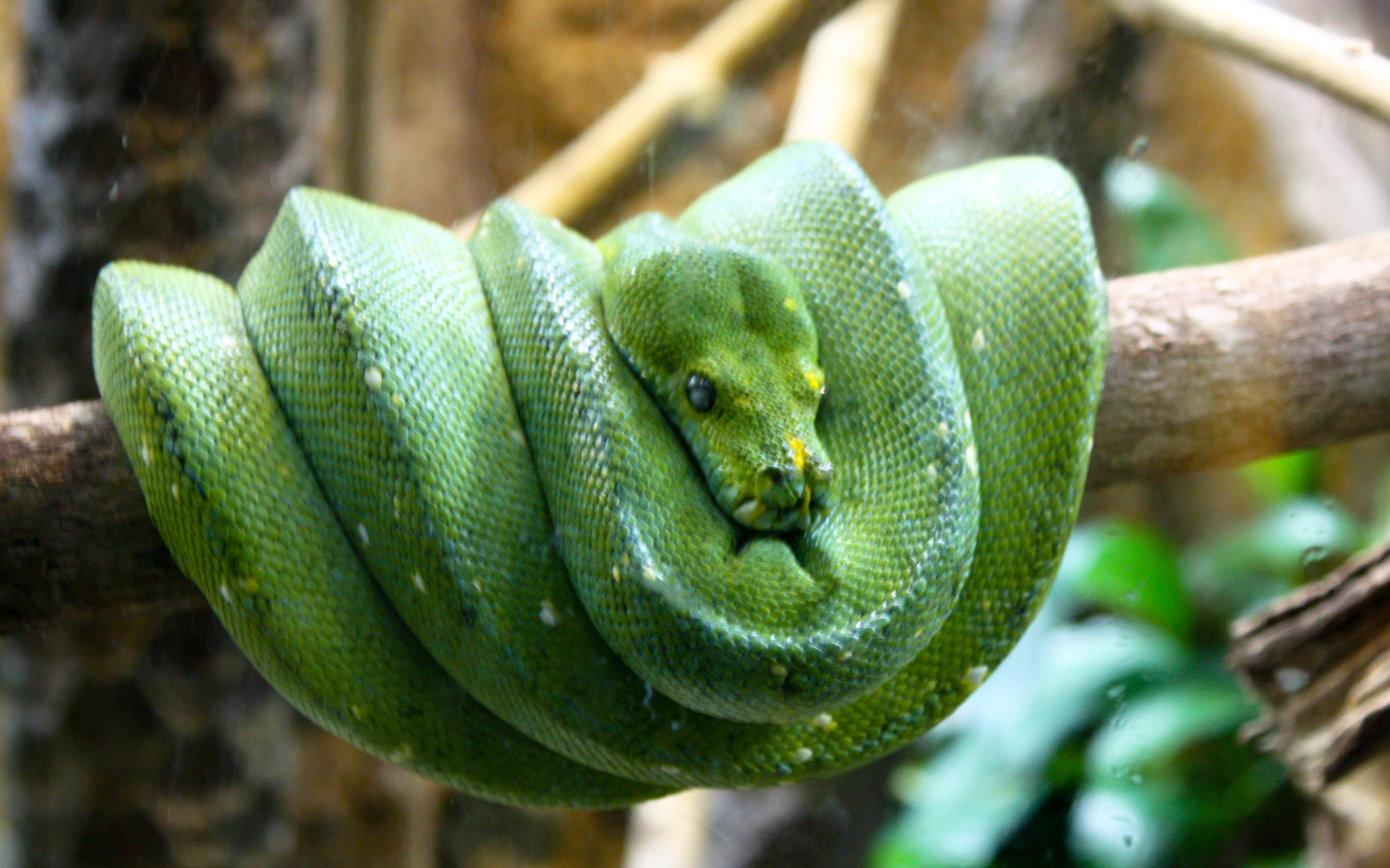
Green tree python

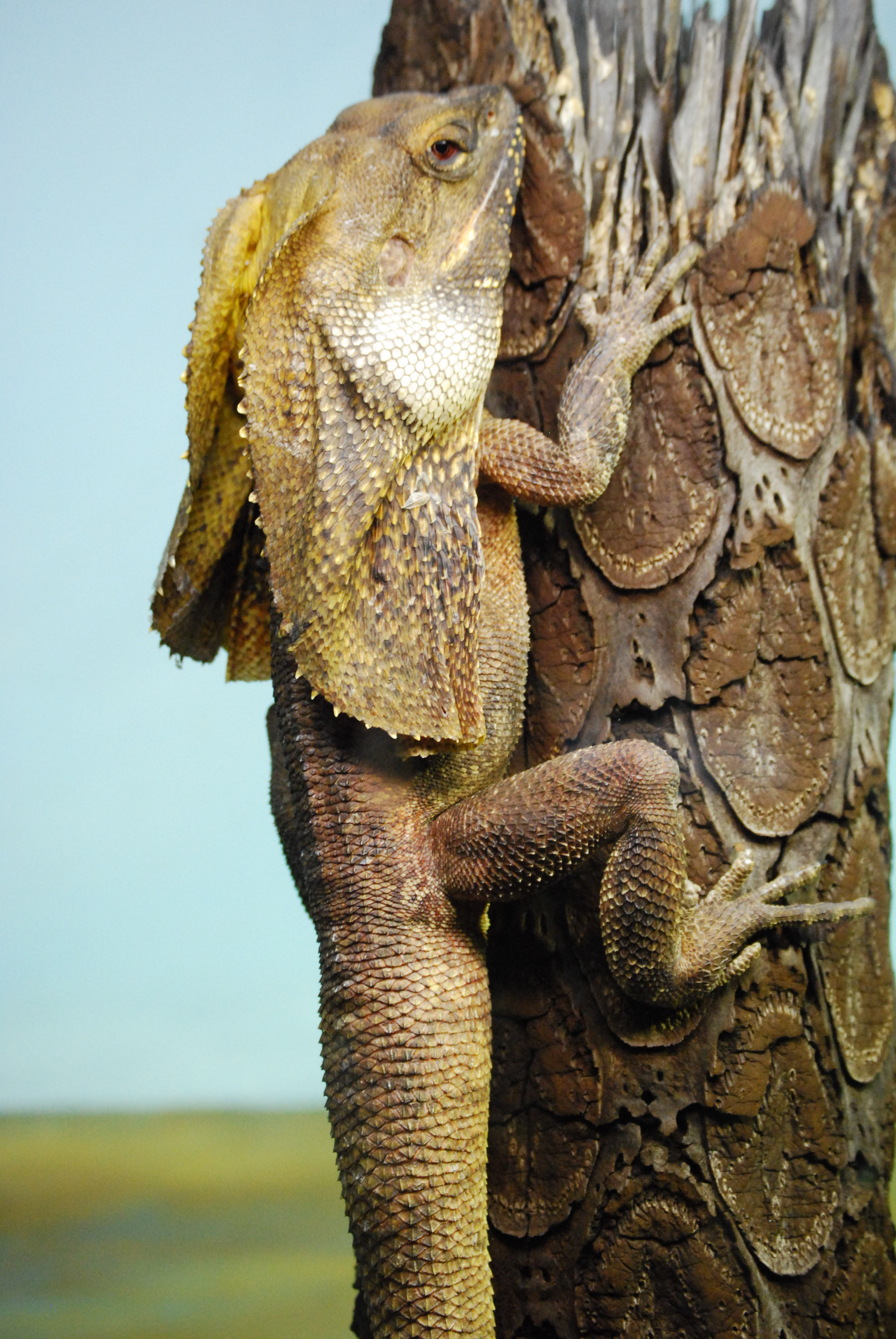
Frilled lizard

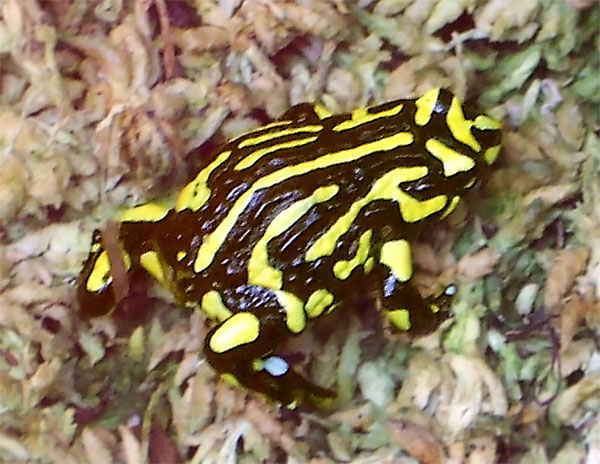
Southern corroboree frog

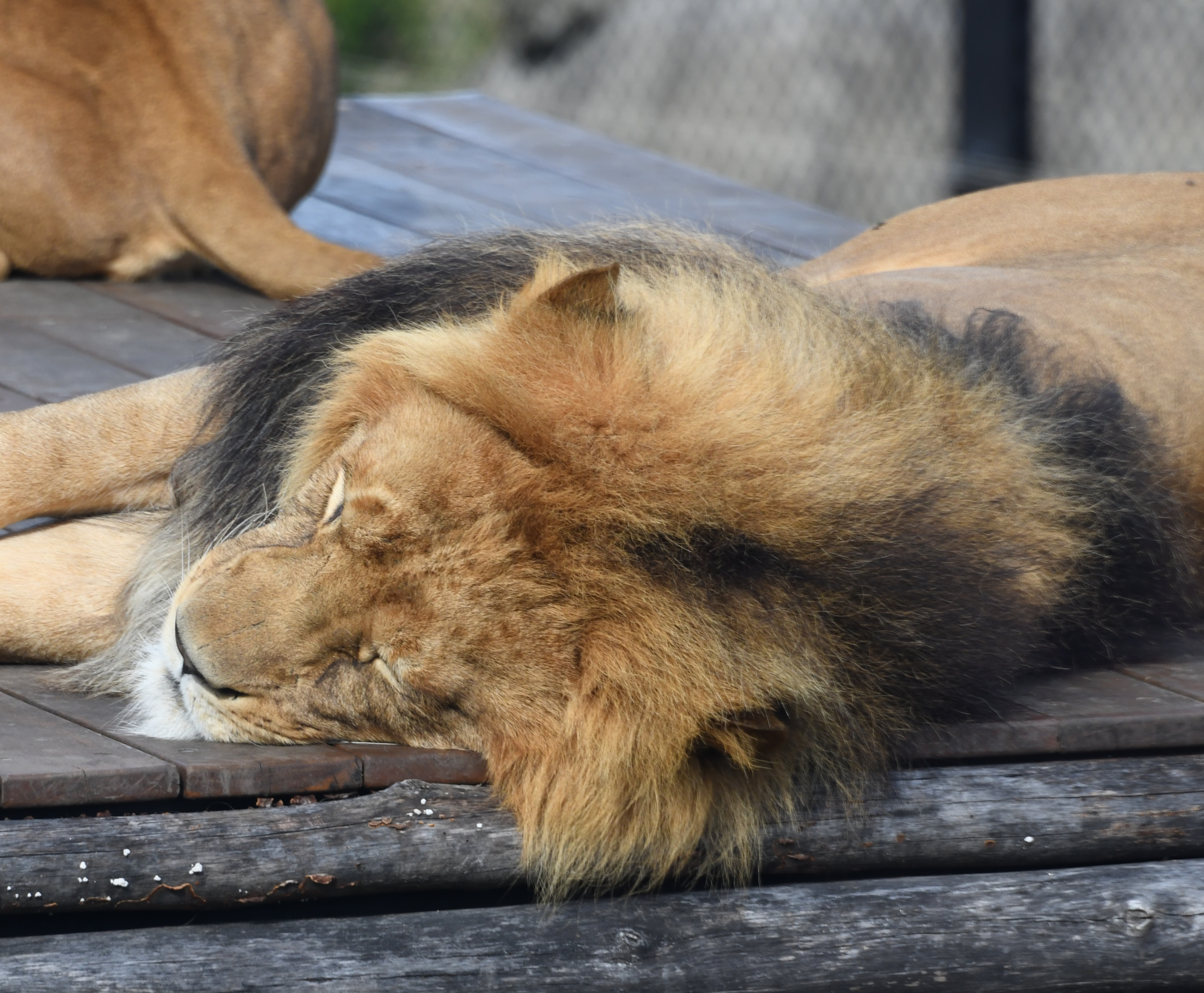
African lion male sleeping

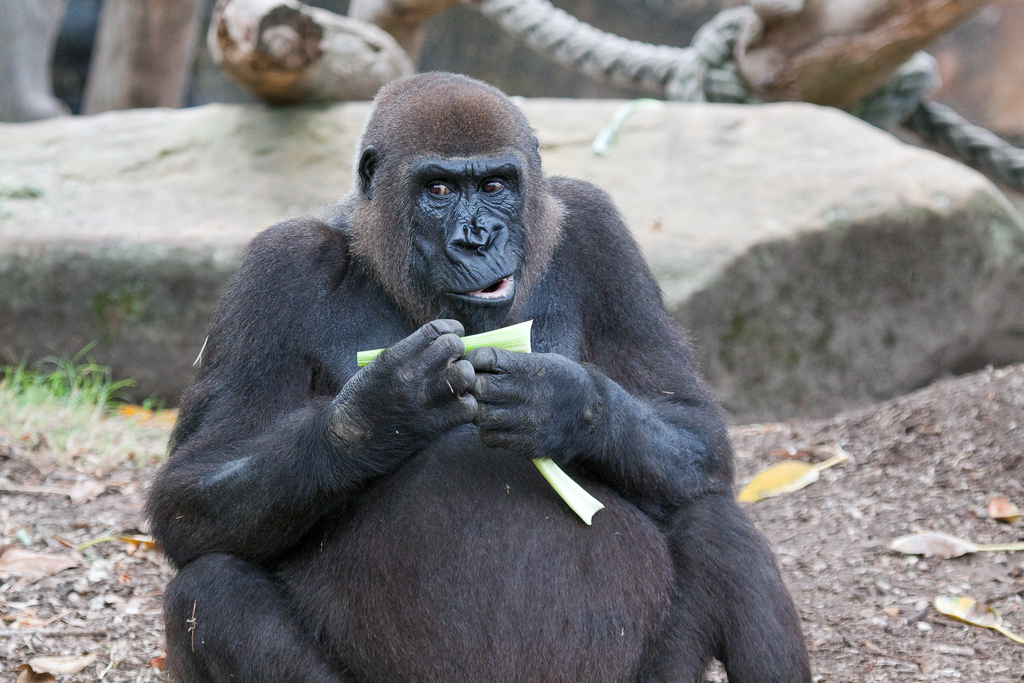
Western lowland gorilla (female)

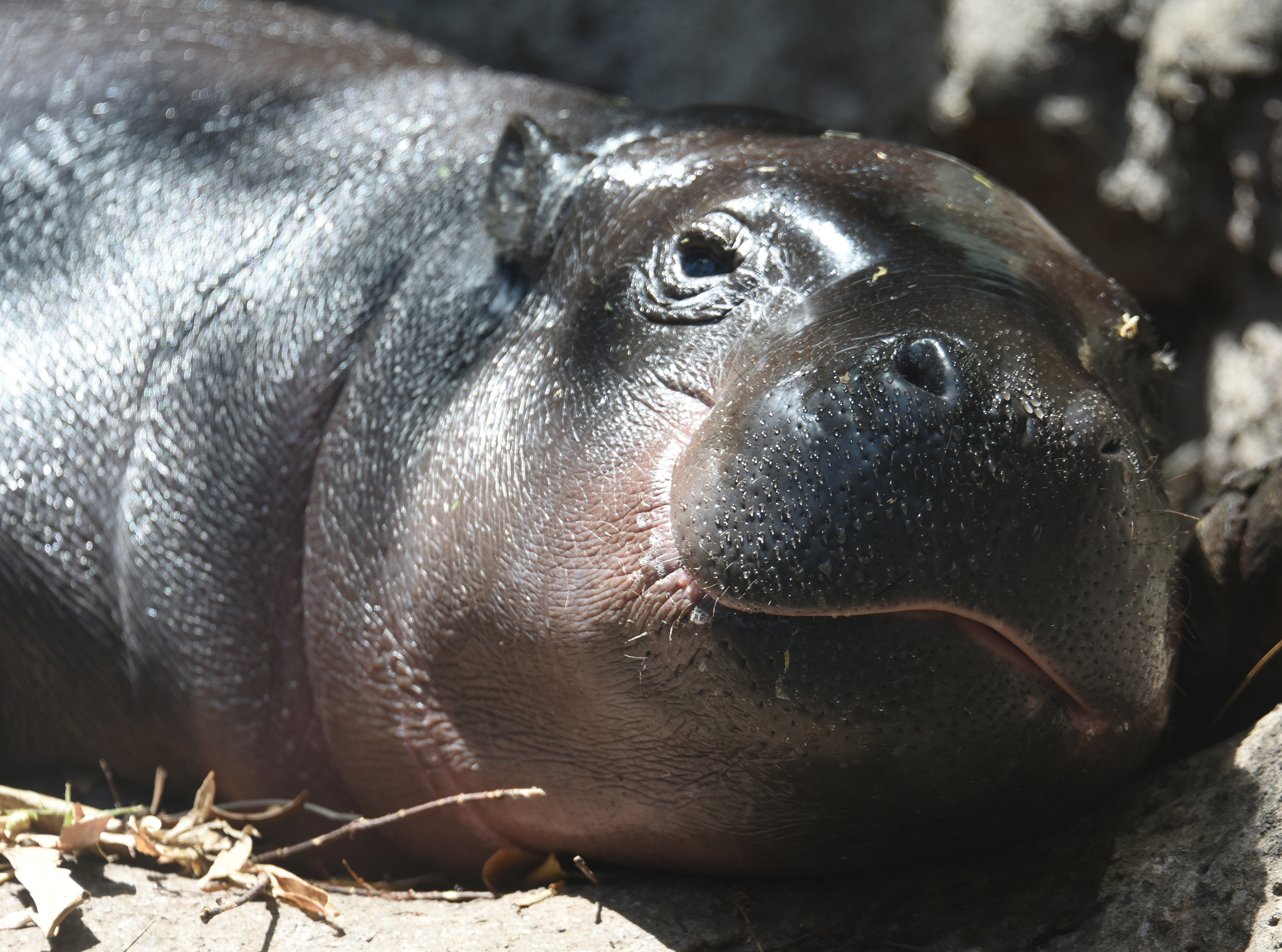
Pygmy hippopotamus

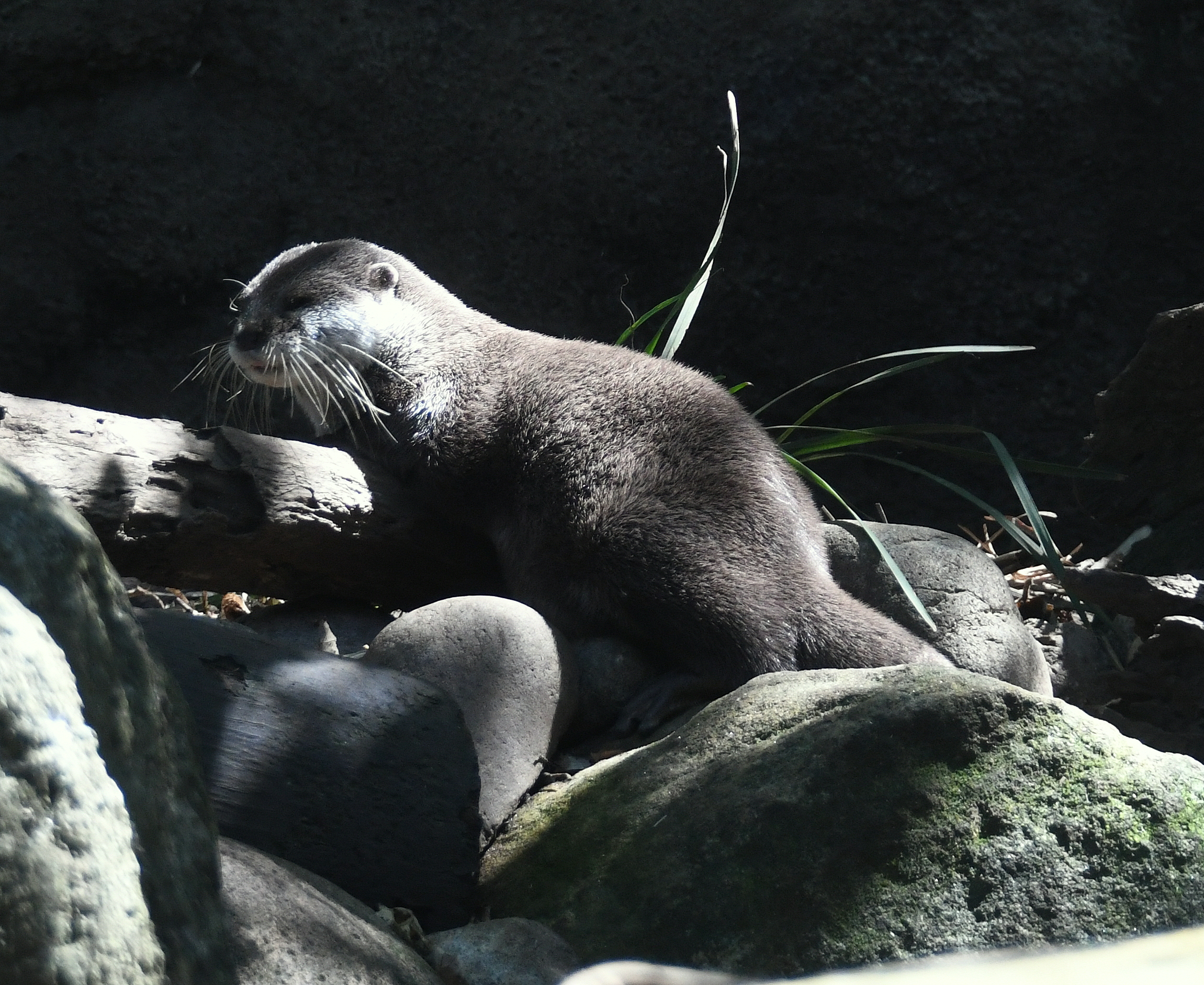
Asian small-clawed otter

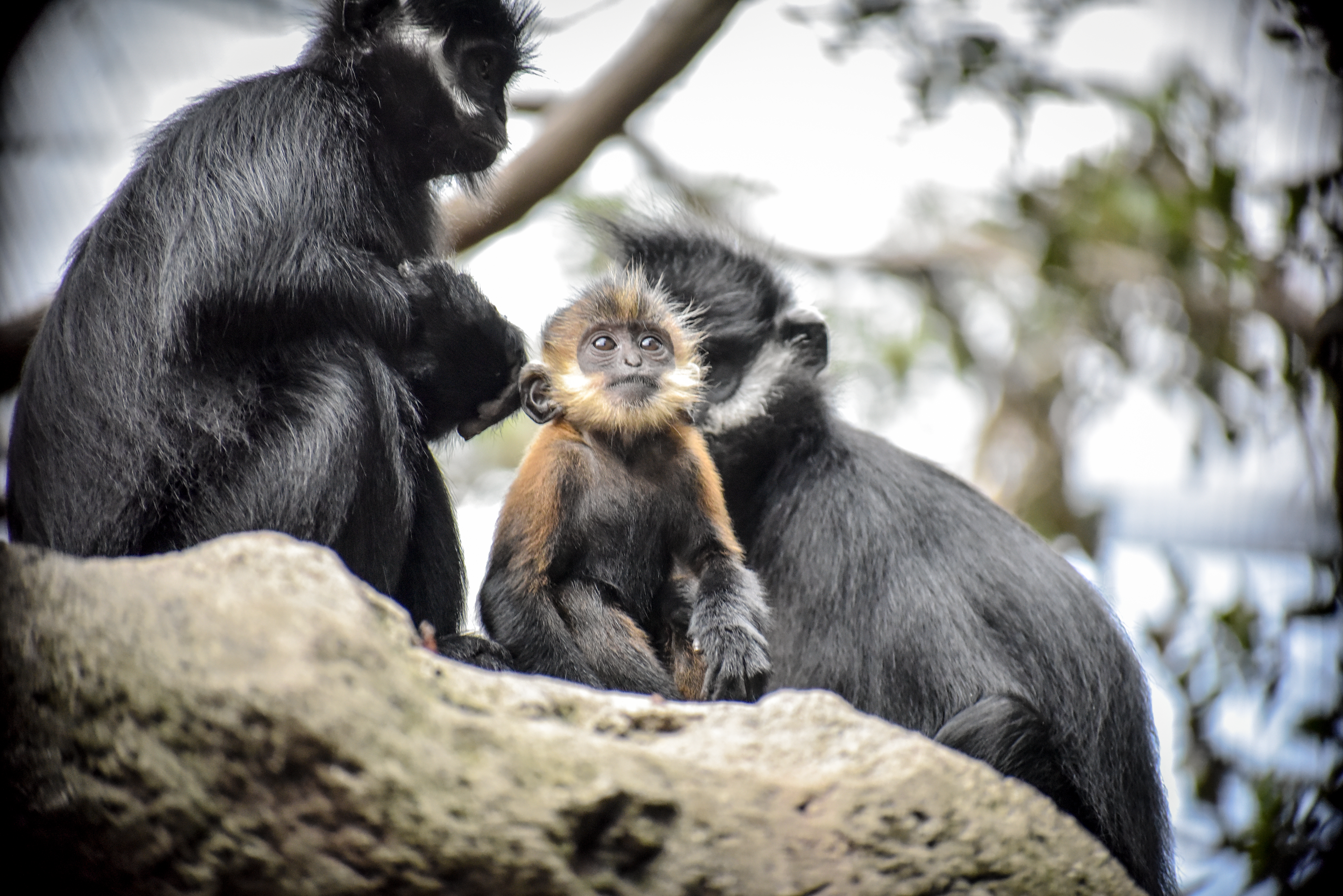
Francois' langurs

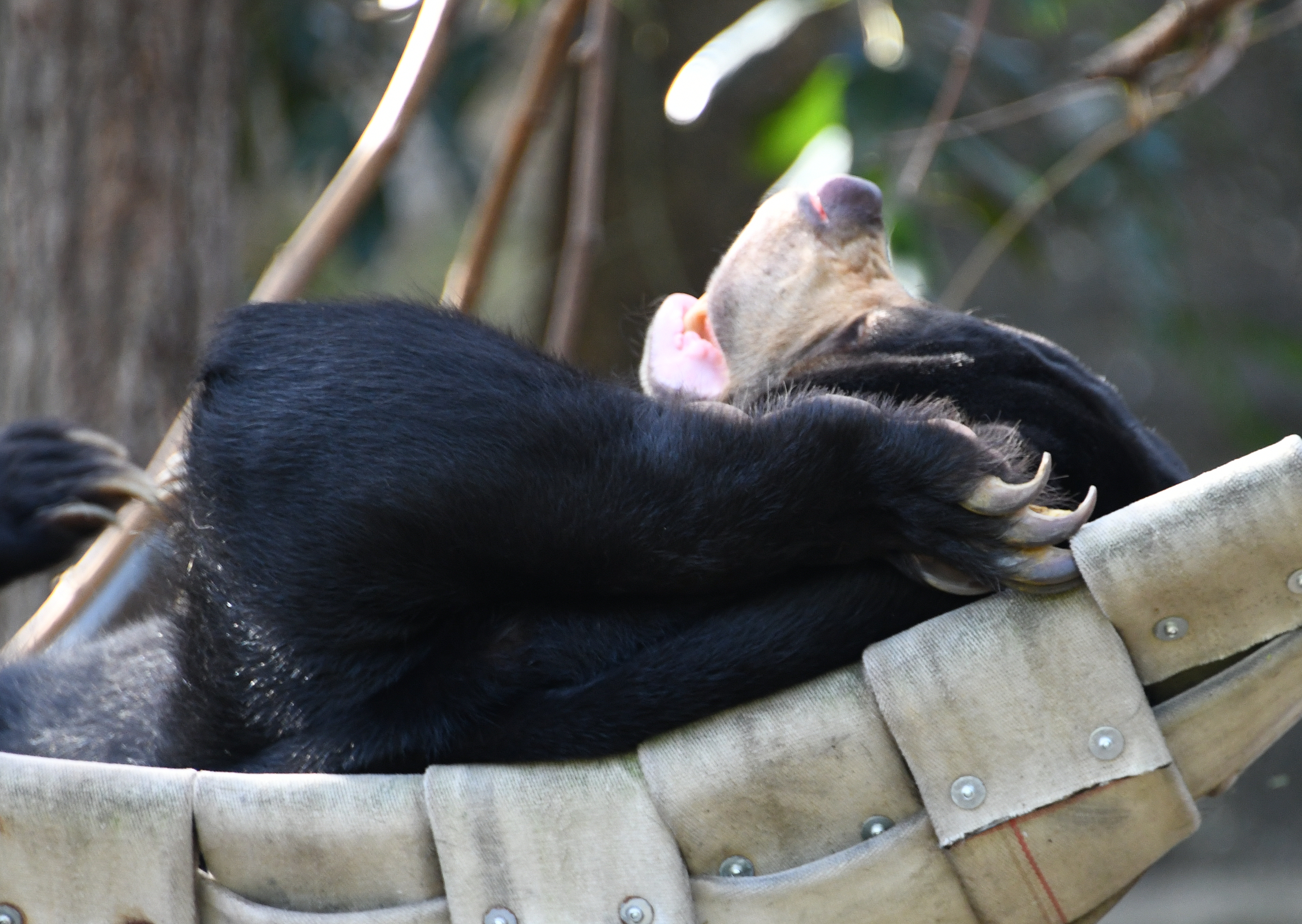
Sun bear Mary a very popular resident

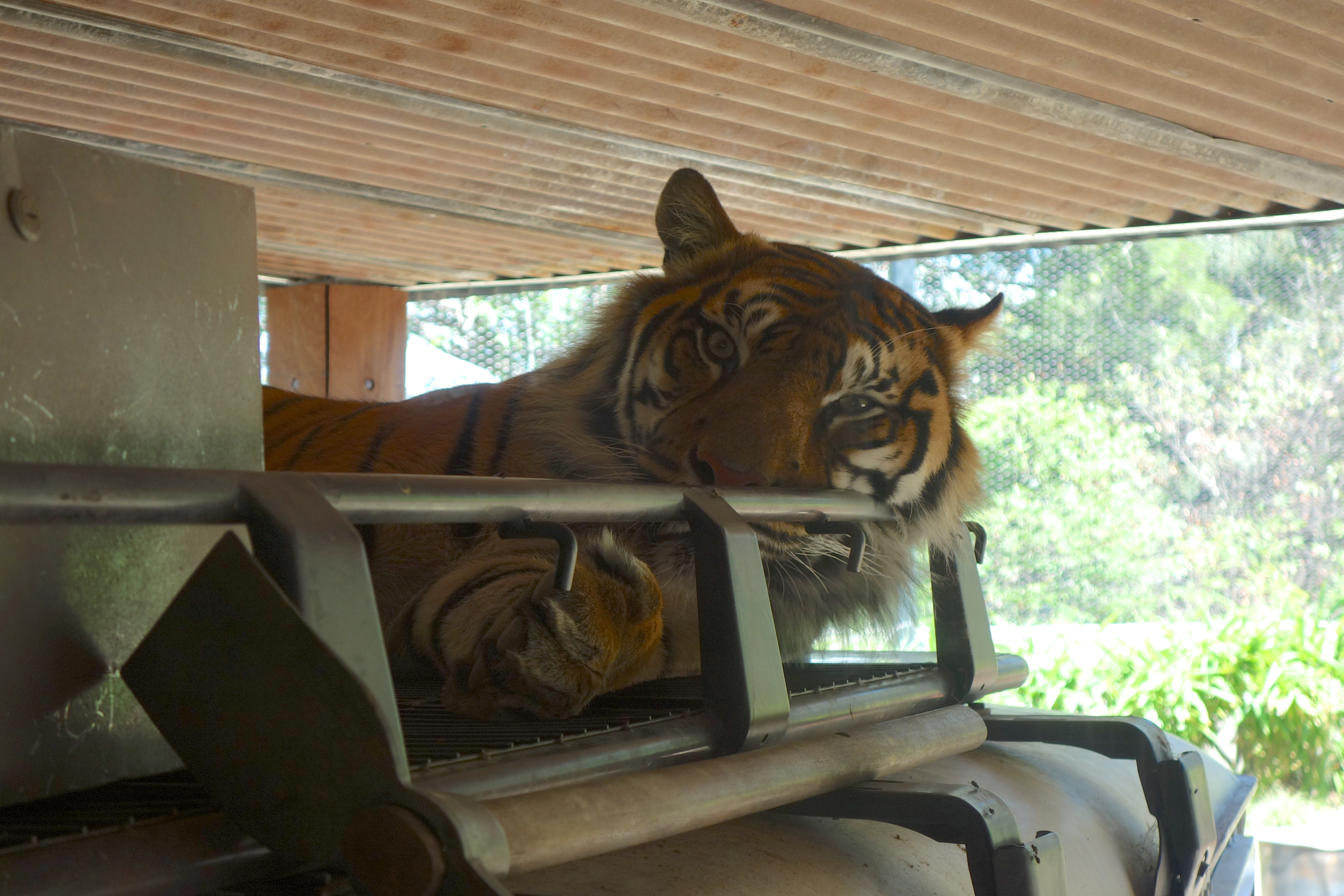
A critically endangered Sumatran tiger in one of the three exhibits which includes viewing through a replica of a national park jeep

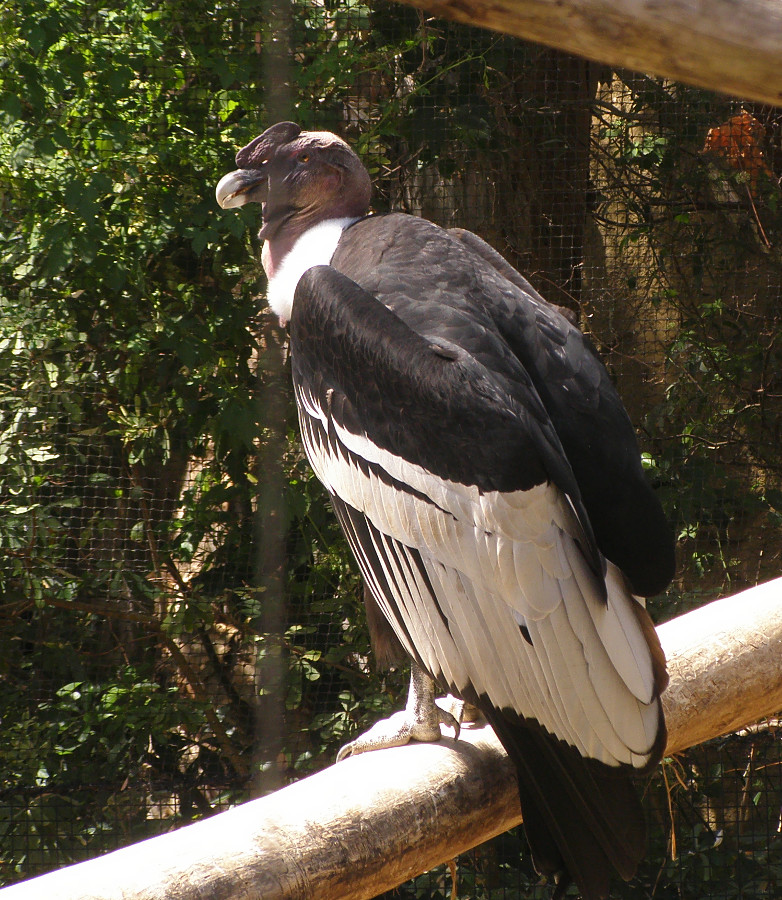
Andean condors have been bred by the zoo since 1979

- Alligator snapping turtle
- Bellinger River turtle
- Black headed python
- Boa constrictor
- Booroolong frog
- Broad-headed snake
- Canberra grassland earless dragon
- Central American eyelash-pitviper
- Centralian carpet python
- Centralian rough knob-tailed gecko
- Chinese three-striped box turtle
- Coastal taipan
- Common death adder
- Corn snake
- Eastern blue tongue lizard
- Eastern diamondback rattlesnake
- Eastern dwarf tree frog
- Eastern Pilbara spiny-tailed skink
- Elongated tortoise
- Emerald tree monitor
- Fijian crested iguana
- Frilled lizard
- Gila monster
- Green tree python
- Indian star tortoise
- Inland taipan
- Lace monitor
- Mary River turtle
- Merten's water monitor
- Monocled cobra
- Northern corroboree frog
- Olive python
- Plumed basilisk
- Pygmy python
- Red-barred dragon
- Red-bellied black snake
- Red-eyed tree frog
- Reticulated python
- Rhinoceros iguana
- Rusty desert monitor
- Scrub python
- Shingleback lizard
- Slater's skink
- Southern corroboree frog
- Tiger snake
- Tuatara
- Veiled chameleon
- White-lipped tree frog
- Yellow spotted bell frog

=== African Savannah ===
- African lion
- Fennec fox
- Giraffe
- Helmeted guineafowl (free roaming)
- Meerkat
- Ostrich
- Plains zebra

=== Chimpanzee Sanctuary ===
- Chimpanzee

=== Gorilla Forest ===
- Western lowland gorilla

=== Moore Park Aviary ===
- Cotton-top tamarin

=== Rhino Reserve ===
- Greater one-horned rhinoceros
- Water buffalo

=== Rainforest Trail ===
- Asian small-clawed otter
- Binturong
- Bolivian squirrel monkey
- Capybara
- Egyptian goose
- François' langur
- Pygmy hippopotamus
- Red junglefowl
- Ruddy shelduck

(Palm Aviary)

- Black-headed munia
- Double-eyed fig parrot
- Forest kingfisher
- Lady Amherst's pheasant
- Luzon bleeding-heart dove
- Metallic starling
- Nicobar pigeon
- Noisy pitta
- Red-whiskered bulbul
- Superb fruit dove
- White-breasted ground dove
- White-rumped shama
- Wompoo fruit-dove

(Wetland Aviary)

- Eastern whipbird
- Glossy ibis
- Java sparrow
- Koi
- Little pied cormorant
- Pied heron
- Red lory
- Royal spoonbill
- Saw-shelled turtle
- Superb fruit dove
- Torresian imperial pigeon
- Wandering whistling duck
- White-rumped shama
- Wompoo fruit-dove

=== Sun Bear Canyon ===
- Sun bear

=== Tiger Trek ===
- Red junglefowl (free roaming)
- Sumatran tiger

=== Primate Islands ===
- Bolivian squirrel monkey
- Cotton-top tamarin

=== Other species ===
- Aldabra giant tortoise
- Andean condor
- Australian brushturkey (wild free roaming)
- Australian pelican
- Australian white ibis (wild free roaming)
- Blue peafowl (free roaming)
- Capybara
- Eastern water dragon (wild free roaming)
- Goodfellow's tree-kangaroo
- Laughing kookaburra (wild free roaming)
- Red panda
- Ring-tailed lemur

=== Taronga Institute of Science & Learning ===
(Educational and research facility, restricted access for general visitors)

(Desert Immersive Classroom)

- Australian zebra finch
- Bilby

(Rainforest Immersive Classroom)

- Chaco tortoise
- Cotton-top tamarin
- Elongated tortoise
- Luzon bleeding-heart dove
- Nicobar pigeon
- Ornate box turtle

(Woodland Immersive Classroom)

- Chiming wedgebill
- Diamond firetail
- Long-nosed potoroo
- Painted finch
- Red-whiskered bulbul
- Superb parrot
- Variegated fairywren

=== Wildlife Retreat Hotel ===
(Overnight guests only)

- Banded archerfish
- Eel-tailed catfish
- Estuary glassfish
- Freshwater forktail catfish
- Koala
- Platypus
- Red-necked pademelon
- Rufous bettong
- Saltwater crocodile
- Short-beaked echidna
- Short-finned eel
- Southern saratoga
- Swamp wallaby
- Tammar wallaby

== Chimpanzee community ==
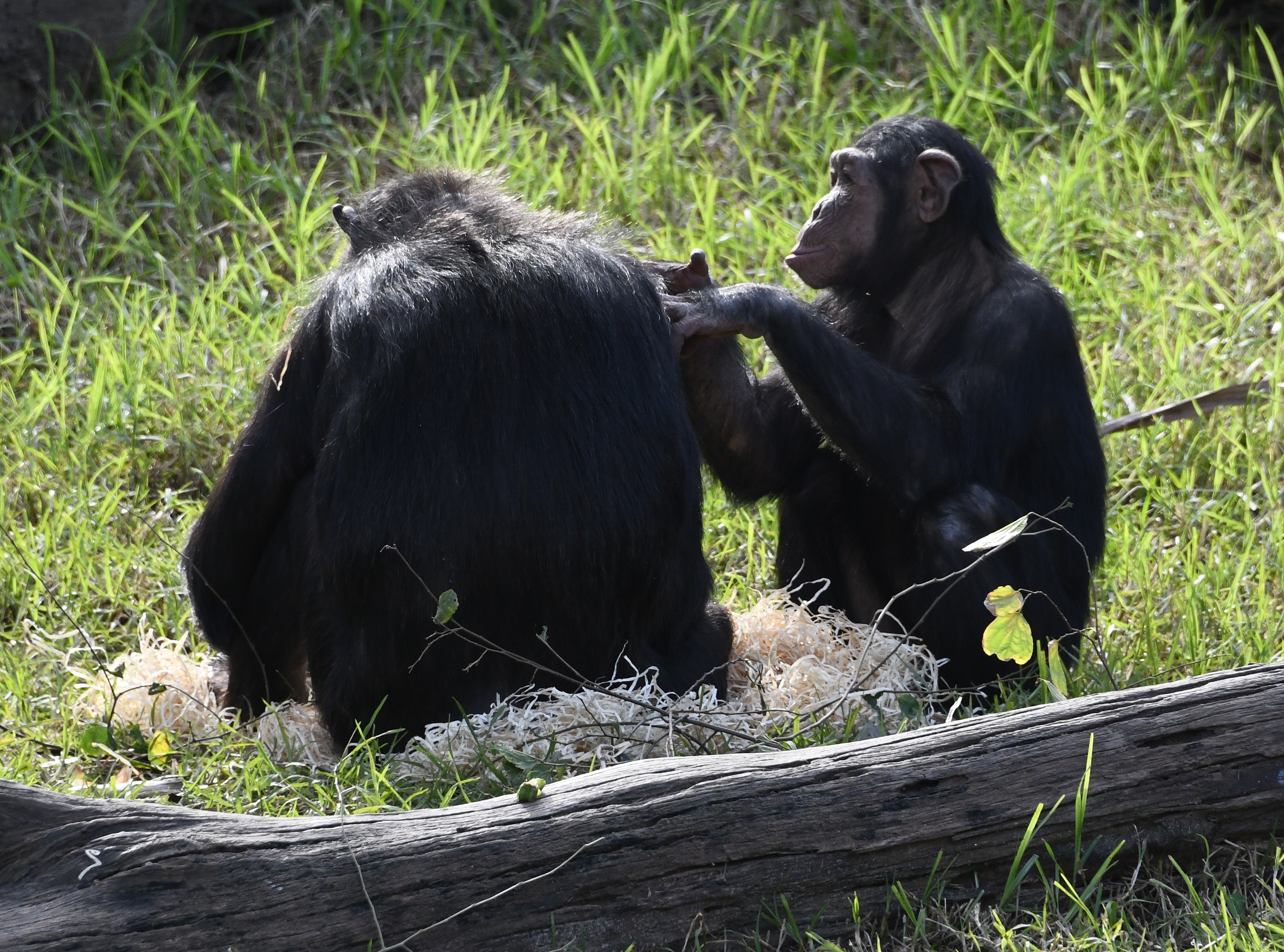
Chimpanzee family

Taronga Zoo is currently home to a multi-male, multi-female troop of 21 chimpanzees of various ages.

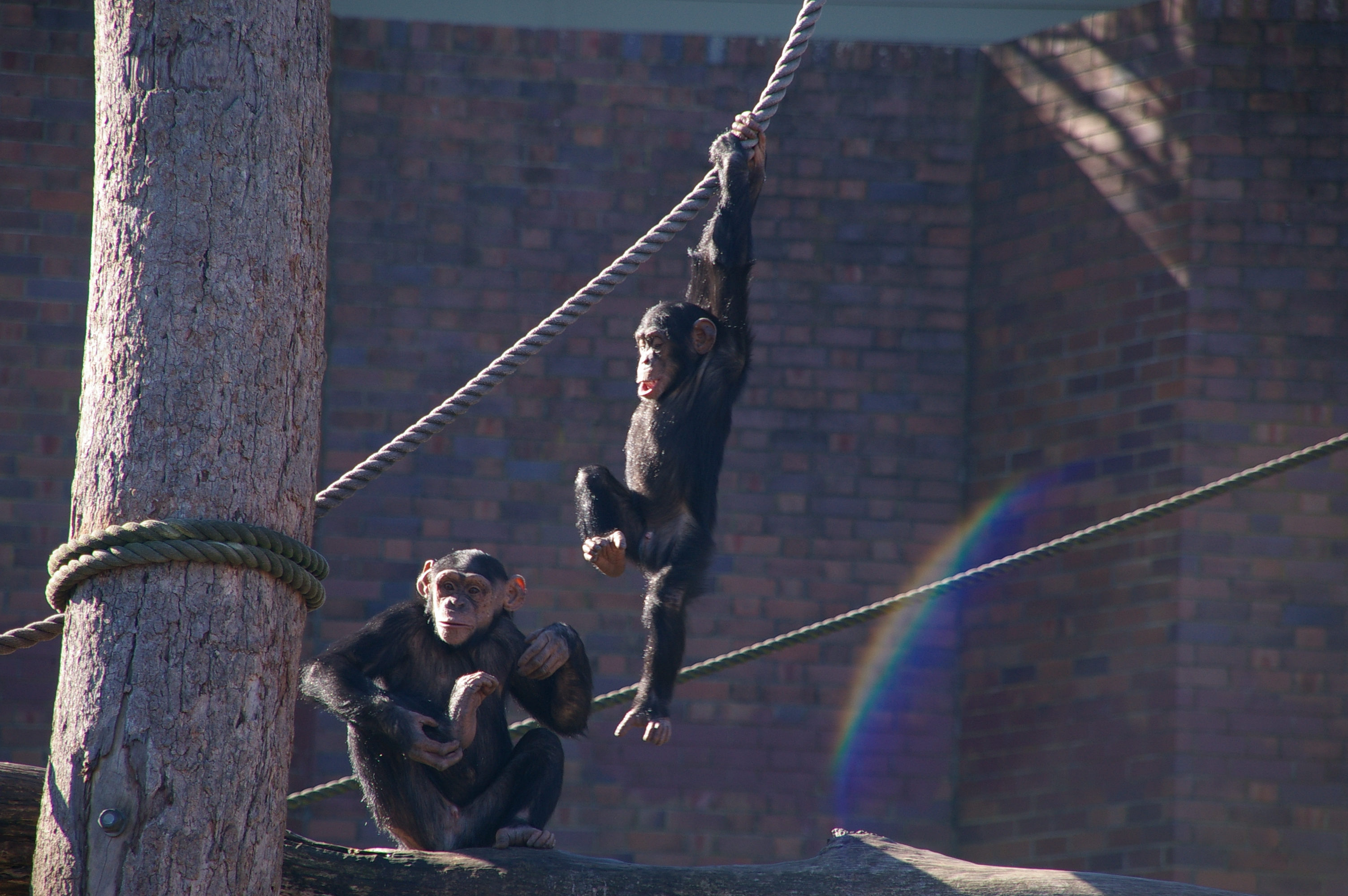
Chimpanzee brothers

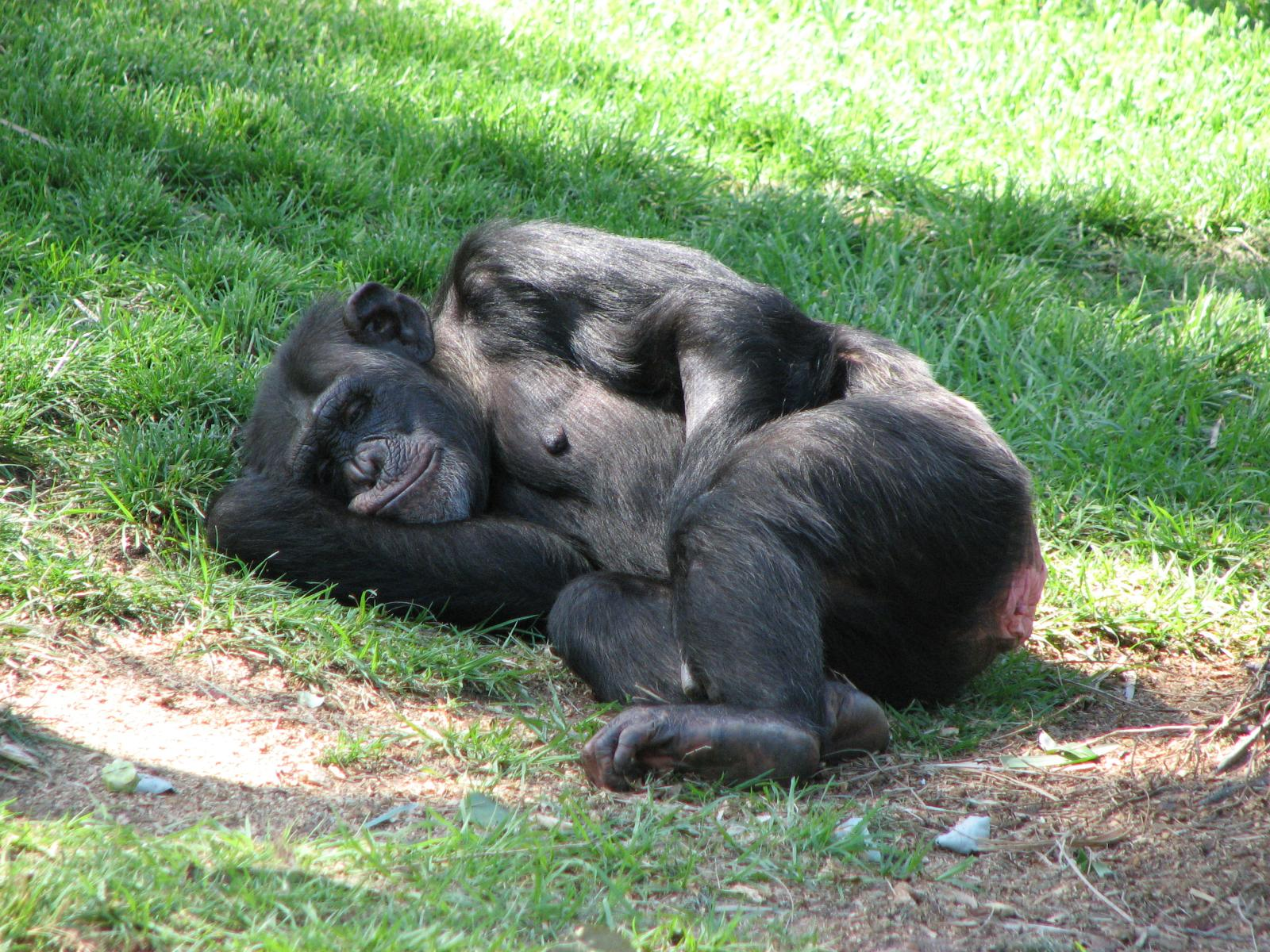

=== Males ===
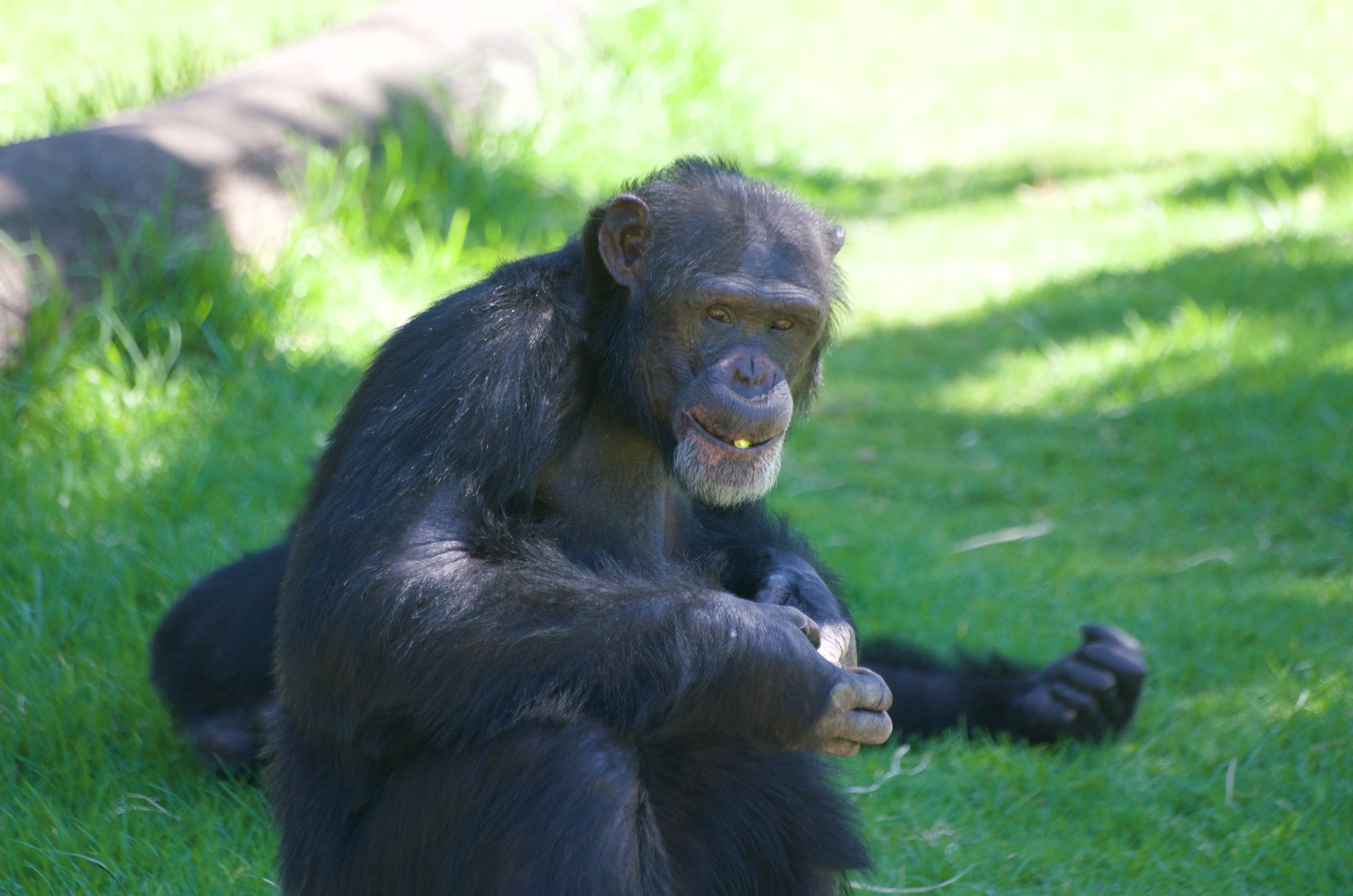
Chimpanzee family in the Chimpanzee Sanctuary

Samaki was born in November 2001 to Shiba. Samaki and his brother Shabani were known for years by keepers as the "S boys" when Samaki acted as a supporter for older brother Shabani during various alpha challenges against previous alpha Lubutu. Samaki has now successfully taken the alpha role for himself with support in particular from Sule. Samaki is the father of Cebele.

Shabani was born in September 1994 to Shiba. Shabani is not very tolerant of the infants in the group and will occasionally redirect aggression towards the females of the group. Shabani had attempted many times to oust previous alpha male Lubutu from his position, but his lack of popularity meant the females supported Lubutu during any conflicts, now his younger brother Samaki has taken the alpha male role.

Furahi was born in February 2003 to Kuma. He is one of two adolescent males in the troop and has a close relationship with his mother, Kuma. Furahi had offered support to his mother, particularly when his baby brother Fumo was born in 2013. Furahi enjoys displaying, like the adult males in the troop and will occasionally harass the females.

Shikamoo was born in July 2003 to Sasha. Shikamoo has a close friendship with Furahi and is often seen bonding with him. Shikamoo is protective of his brother, Sule, and is popular amongst the females of the troop, particularly Kuma and Kamili. Shikamoo is the father of Fumo.

Sule was born in April 2008 to Sasha. Sule was the youngest member of the troop for five years until the birth of Fumo. Sule had often babysitting Fumo when he was smaller. He has likely learnt this behaviour from his elder brother, Shikamoo, who used to interact with Sule in a similar way. Sule has shown advanced social skills from a young age and often acts as a peacemaker during altercations. He is popular amongst the troop and enjoys showing off to the visitors. He occasionally has tantrums and flicks his hands in the air. Sule is currently the alpha male of the troop.

Fumo was born in October 2013 to Kuma. He is the oldest of the four infants in the community. Kuma has encouraged Fumo's development from an early age and he is advanced in his climbing skills. Fumo had recently begun using the artificial termite mound at a very early age. Fumo has created a good relationship with the youngest infant, Cebele.

Sudi was born in August 2014 to Shiba. Sudi has been kept under close protection from his mother, and has not been allowed the freedom to explore, Kuma has allowed Fumo.

Liwali was born in September 2014 to Lisa. Liwali was the youngest chimpanzee in the group for three years until Cebele was born in 2017. Liwali has developed a close bond with the other two infants, Fumo and Sudi, as they have grown up together.

Niambi was born in October 2020 to Naomi.

=== Females ===
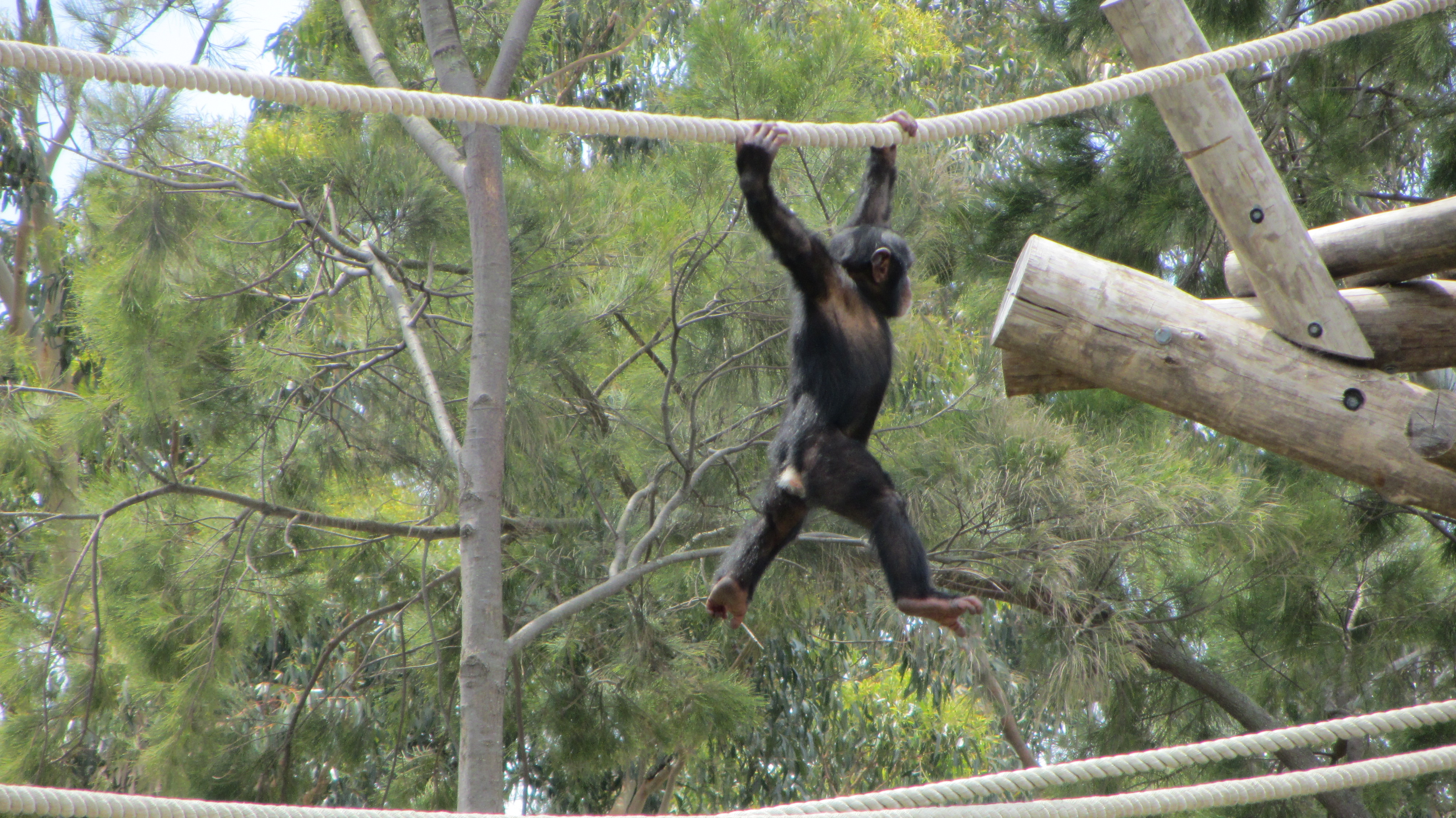
Chimpanzee climbing in the Chimpanzee Sanctuary

Lisa was born at Taronga Zoo in August 1979 to Lulu and is the highest ranking female, and the most senior Chimpanzee in the community. Lisa has had five offspring including a son Lobo who was born in June 1989 and died in November 1996, a son Lubutu who was born in June 1993, a daughter Lani who was born in May 2002 and a son Liwali who was born in September 2014. Lani has since moved zoos.

Sasha was born at Taronga Zoo in June 1980 to Spitter. Sacha has had six offspring including a son Sokwe who was born in August 1989 and died in October 1989, a daughter Kike who was born in April 1991, a son Sandali who was born in February 1996, an unnamed daughter who was born and died in September 2002, a son Shikamoo was born in July 2003 and a son Sule who was born in April 2008. Kike was exported to Perth Zoo in June 1998 and Sandali was exported to Adelaide Zoo in December 2008.

Shiba was born in May 1981 to Susie and has produced five offspring: A son, Shabani, in 1994; an unnamed male who died at birth in 1999; a son, Samaki, in 2001; a daughter, Sembe, in 2008; and a son, Sudi, in 2014. Shiba is a high ranking female in the troop and is independent and tough. Her mother, Susie, died in 1995, leaving Shiba without the maternal support Lisa and Sasha had from their mothers. Today, Shiba has support in conflicts from her two adult sons, Shabani and Samaki. She did not initially accept Lubutu's take over as alpha male in 2001 as he was only eight years old, and she likely realised his threat to her son Shabani's chances of becoming the alpha male. Shiba is fiercely protective of her offspring and access to her newborn son, Sudi, by the troop was very restricted while he was small.

Shona was born in October 1987 and is the lowest ranking adult. Shona was sterilised during the 1990s and has never produced any offspring. Shona has a good relationship with the alpha male, Lubutu, but receive little support from the other chimpanzee, including her aunt, Shiba. Shona is a small chimpanzee and is often harassed by the males. Shona has a good relationship with Kamili.

Kuma was born in December 1991 to Ficha and has given birth to three offspring, a son Furahi who was born in February 2003, an unnamed daughter who was born and died in October 2012 and a son Fumo who was born in October 2013. Kuma, then an adolescent, had a difficult time raising her first son, Furahi, due to a lack of family support. Furahi, now fully grown, and supported Kuma in raising her second son, Fumo. Kuma has made significant advances in the hierarchy. This success is due to her large size, the support of an adult son, and her ferocity. It is not uncommon to see Kuma take on the alpha or beta male and win, especially if she is defending Furahi in conflicts.

Kamili was born in September 1995 to Koko, and has had three offspring. Her first offspring, was an unnamed daughter, born in 2005, who died in 2005. Kamili gave birth again in 2013, to an unnamed son, which died after birth. Kamili gave birth to her third offspring in 2014, which died shortly after birth due to mismothering. Kamili had been separated, along with her pregnant mother, Koko, to allow the two low ranked females to raise their young in safety during the critical first weeks, but this was unsuccessful. Koko, and Kamili are often involved with conflicts within the group and receive little support from the others. In 2004, Koko and Kamili attacked Shiba's juvenile son, Samaki, who probably would have been killed, had Shiba not intervened. Kamili is close to Shona and the pair often spend time grooming each other.

Sembe was born in February 2008 to Shiba. Sembe has always been very close to her mother, Shiba, and had struggled to adjust to the birth of her new sibling, Sudi. Sembe was still riding on her mother's back at the age of six but as Shiba's pregnancy advanced, she grew less tolerant of this. Sembe often walked, one arm draped over her mother. Sembe is a feisty young female who had struggled to adjust to life within the community when her mother was fully absorbed with Sudi. Sembe lacks the social skills displayed by Sule and will have to work hard if she is to make any connections outside of her family. She remains close to her adult brothers, Shabani and Samaki and often interacts with Sule, who is two months younger. For many years, Sembe was dominant to Sule, but as they entered adolescence, the roles quickly began to reverse.

Naomi was born at Givskud zoo in Denmark. She adjusted well to her move, however is often involved in fights with members within her group.

Ceres was born at Givskud zoo in Denmark. She has had two offspring, including a daughter on 14 November 2017 named Cebele. During the time of birth, Ceres was very protective of Cebele and always made sure that she knew of her whereabouts. Cebele couldn't get very far from her mother, who was very selective about who she played with. Cebele was often seen clinging to her mother's stomach and cuddling with her mother and Fumo. Sadly Cebele died in July 2023 from an illness just a few weeks before Ceres would give birth again.

Safiri was born in May 2019 to Shiba.

Lemba was born to Lisa in May 2023.

Cekiri was born to Ceres in July 2023. She is currently the youngest Chimpanzee in the community.

=== Notable past chimpanzees ===
Lubutu was born in June 1993 to Lisa and was the long term alpha male of the chimpanzee troop at Taronga Zoo up until his sudden death from lung failure. Lubutu took on the role of alpha male at the age of nine years after the previous alpha male, Snowy (his father) died suddenly. Lubutu was tolerant of the infants in the group and was often seen playing with them. Through his fair leadership and support from the females in the troop, Lubutu attributed to his success and lengthy tenure as a leader. At one point during Lubutu's leadership, Samaki and Shabani stood an excellent chance of taking over the alpha role. Lubutu was the father of Samaki, Furahi, Shikamoo, Sembe and Sule. He was vasectomised in 2009, as his genetics were well represented in the region. Lubutu died in December 2019.

Spitter was born at Taronga Zoo Sydney in June 1960 to Biddy. Spitter had seven offspring including an unnamed son who was born and died in January 1972, an unnamed son who was born and died in July 1973, a daughter Speedy who was born in May 1975 and died in July 1975, a daughter Sheba who was born in June 1978 and died in September 1978, a daughter Sacha who was born in June 1980, a daughter Sally who was born in January 1985 and a son Gombe who was born in December 1988 and died in May 2001. Sally was transferred to Wellington Zoo in April 1992. Spitter died in March 2022.

Koko was born in January 1972 in the wild, and came to Taronga Zoo Sydney in February 1993. She had five offspring including an unnamed daughter who was born and died in August 1994, a daughter Kamili who was born in September 1995, an unnamed daughter who was born and died in June 1999, an unnamed daughter who was born and died in February 2003 and an unnamed son who was born and died in September 2014. Koko died in May 2019.

== Gallery ==
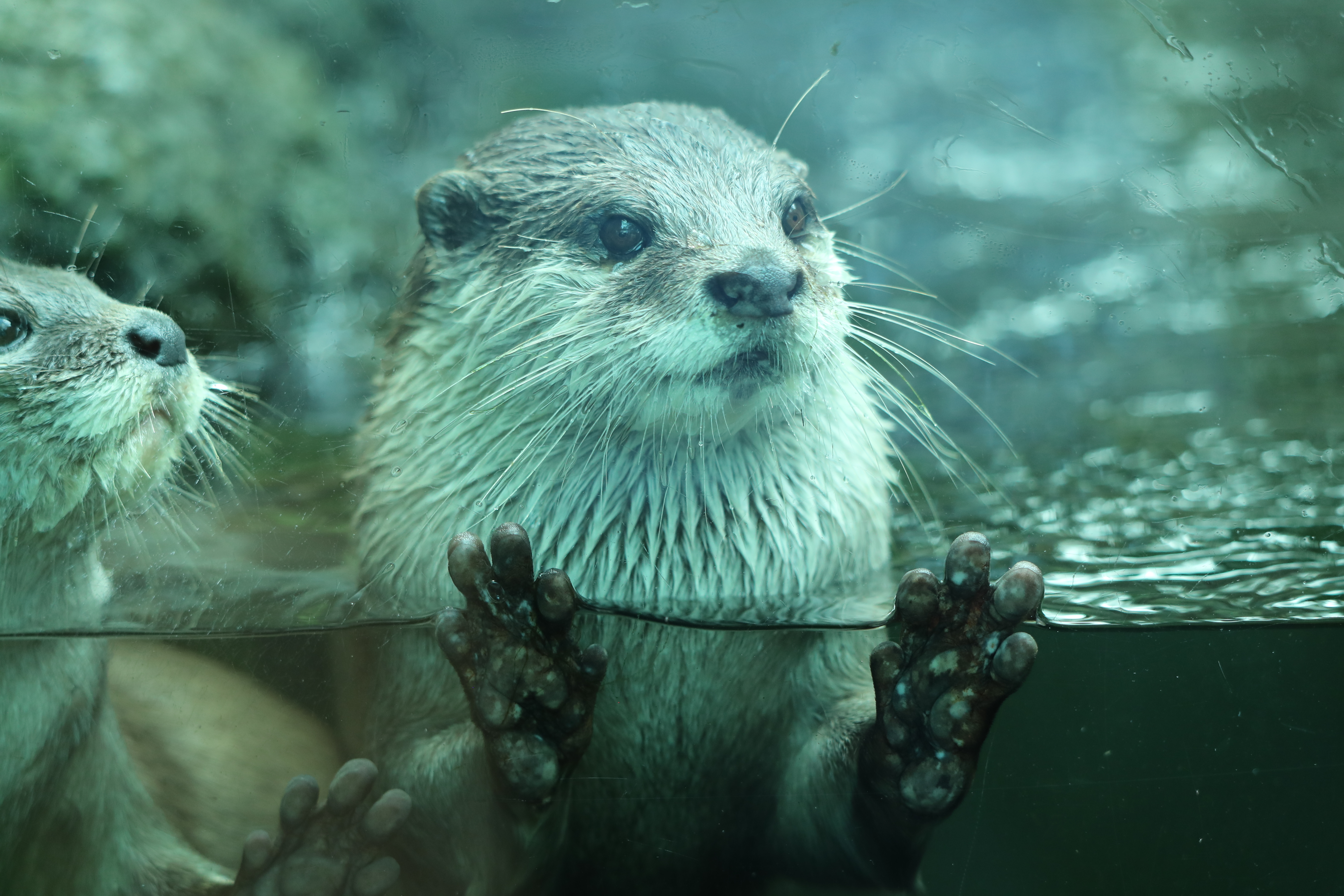
Asian small-clawed otter

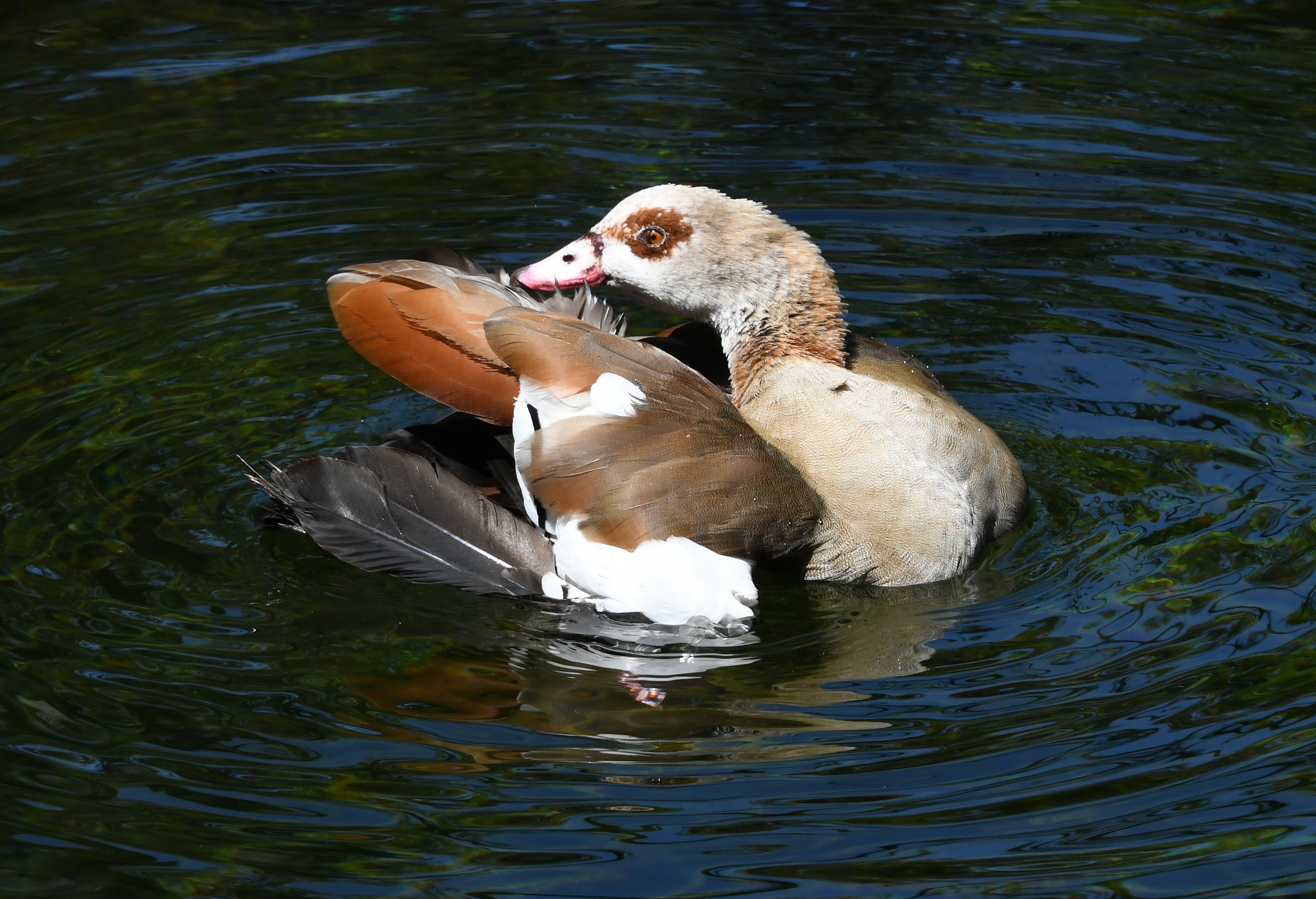
Egyptian goose

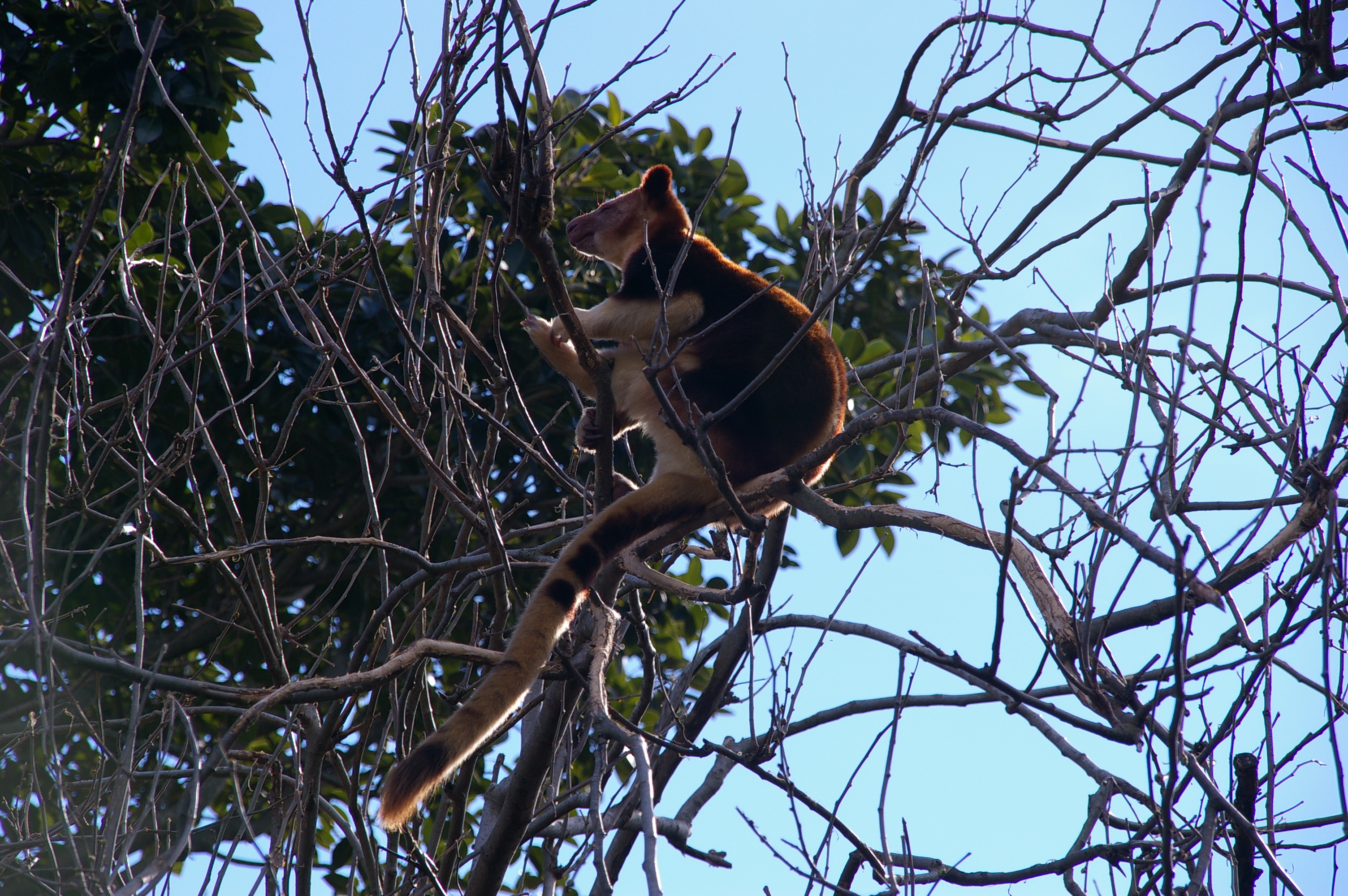
Goodfellow's tree-kangaroo

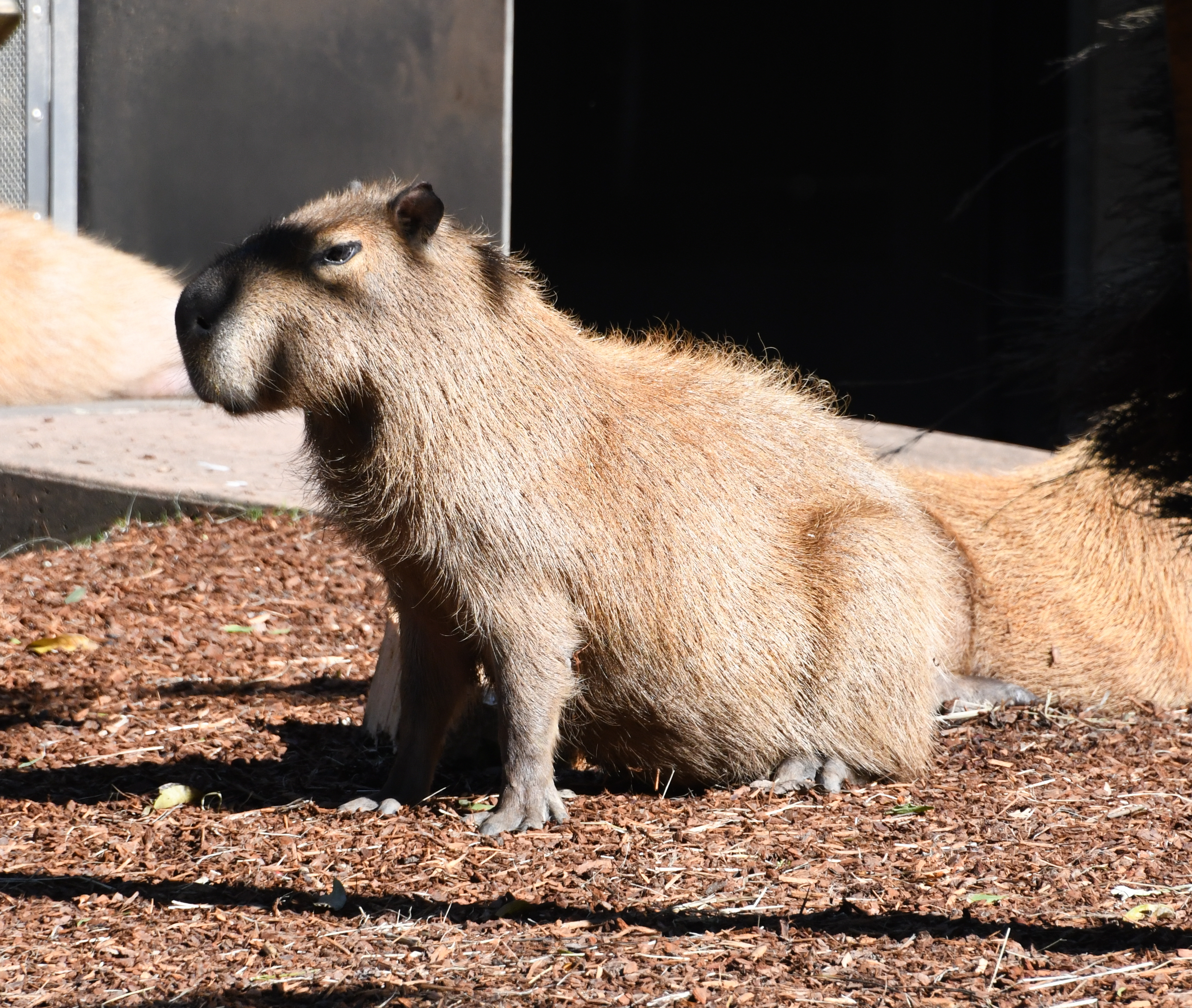
Capybara

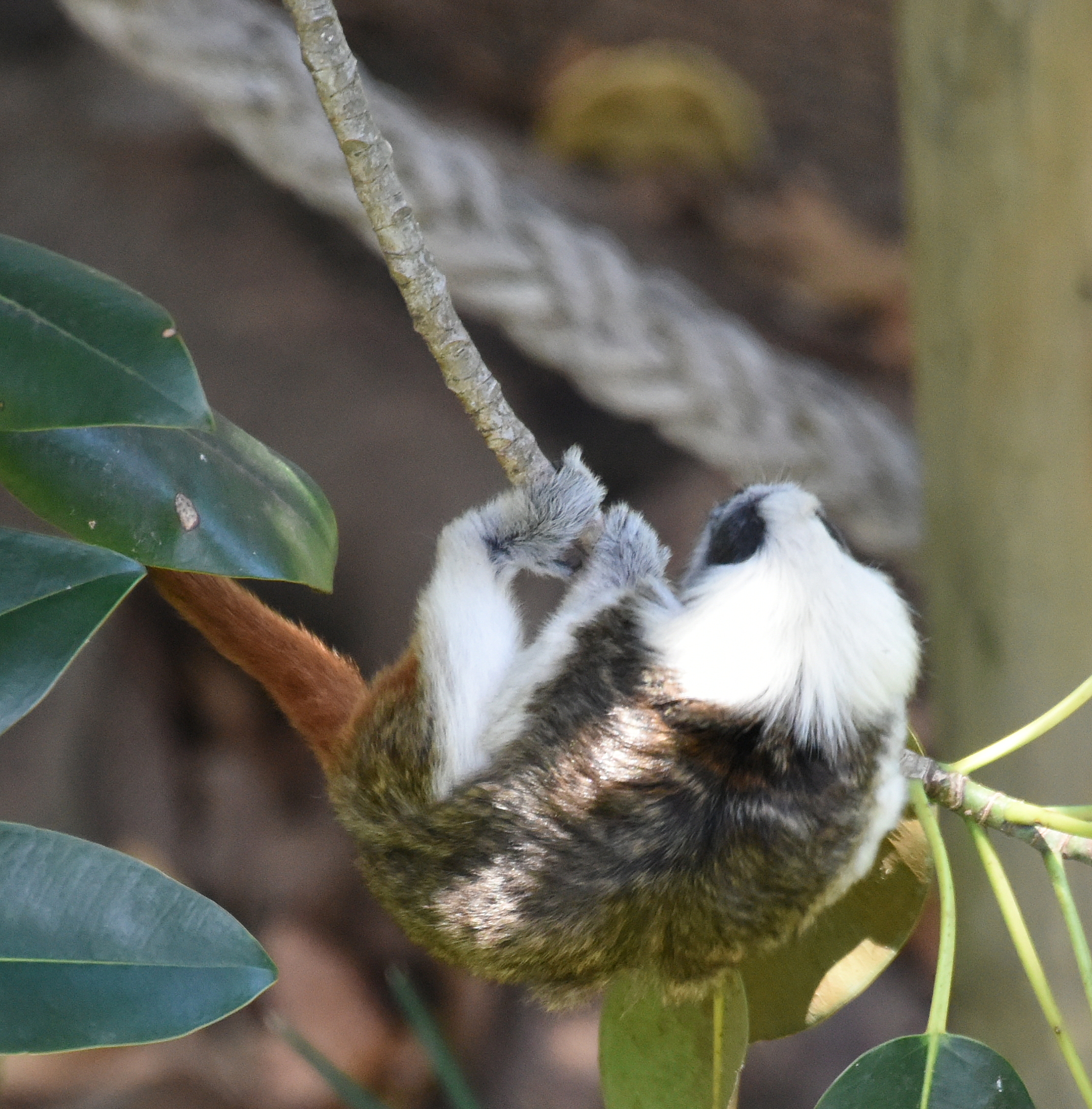
Cotton-top tamarin on Moreton Bay fig

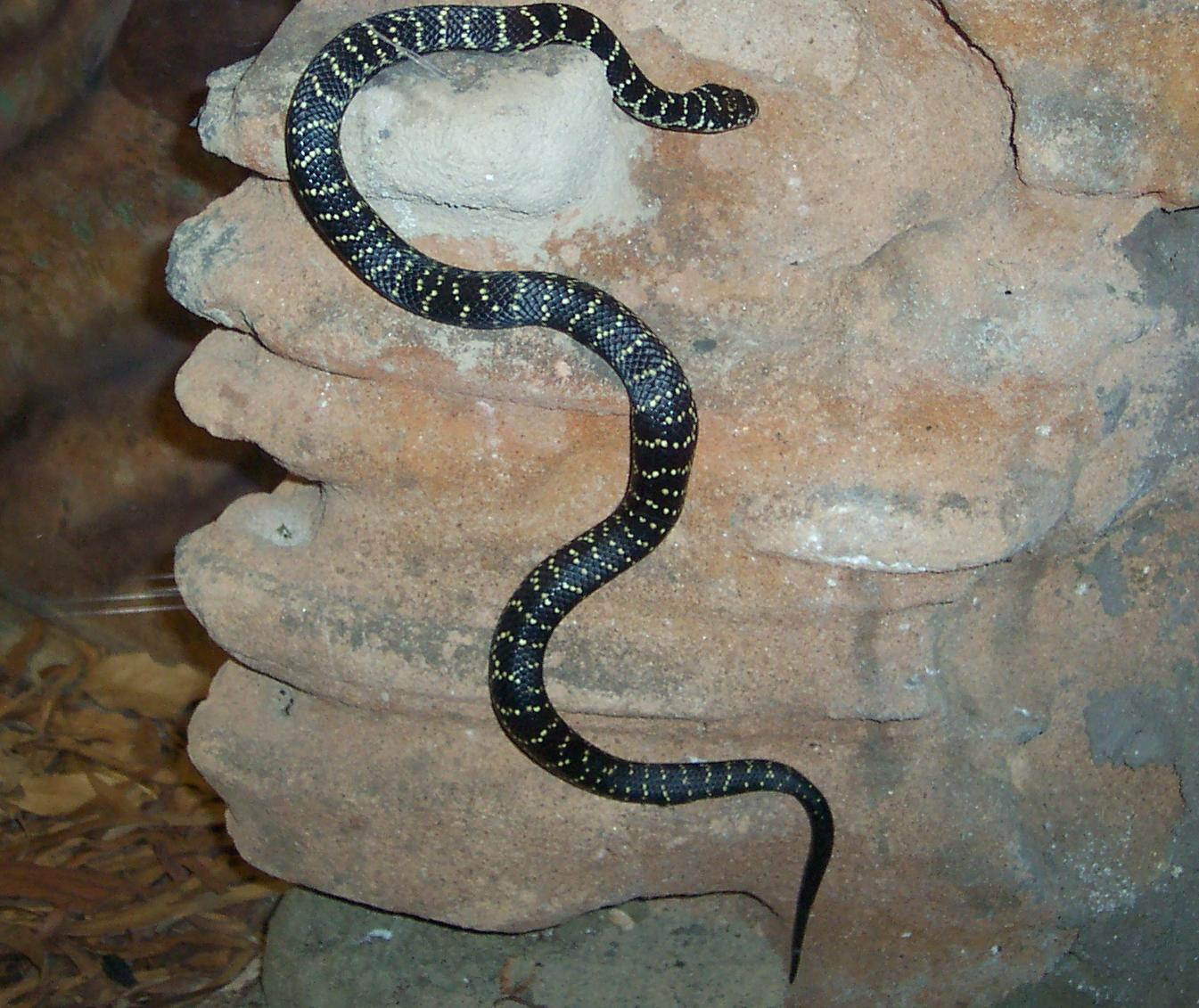
Broad-headed snake

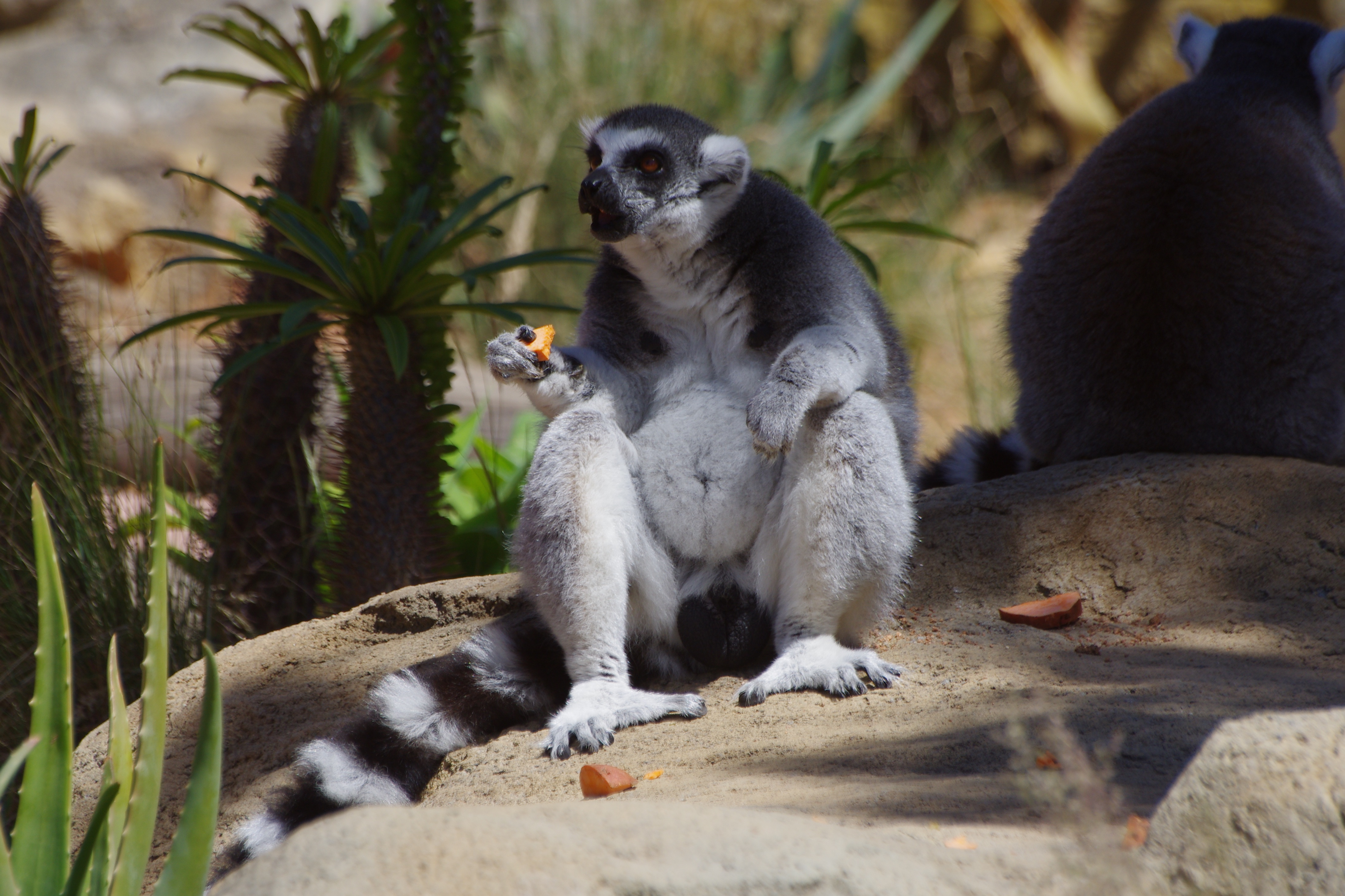
Ring-tailed lemur

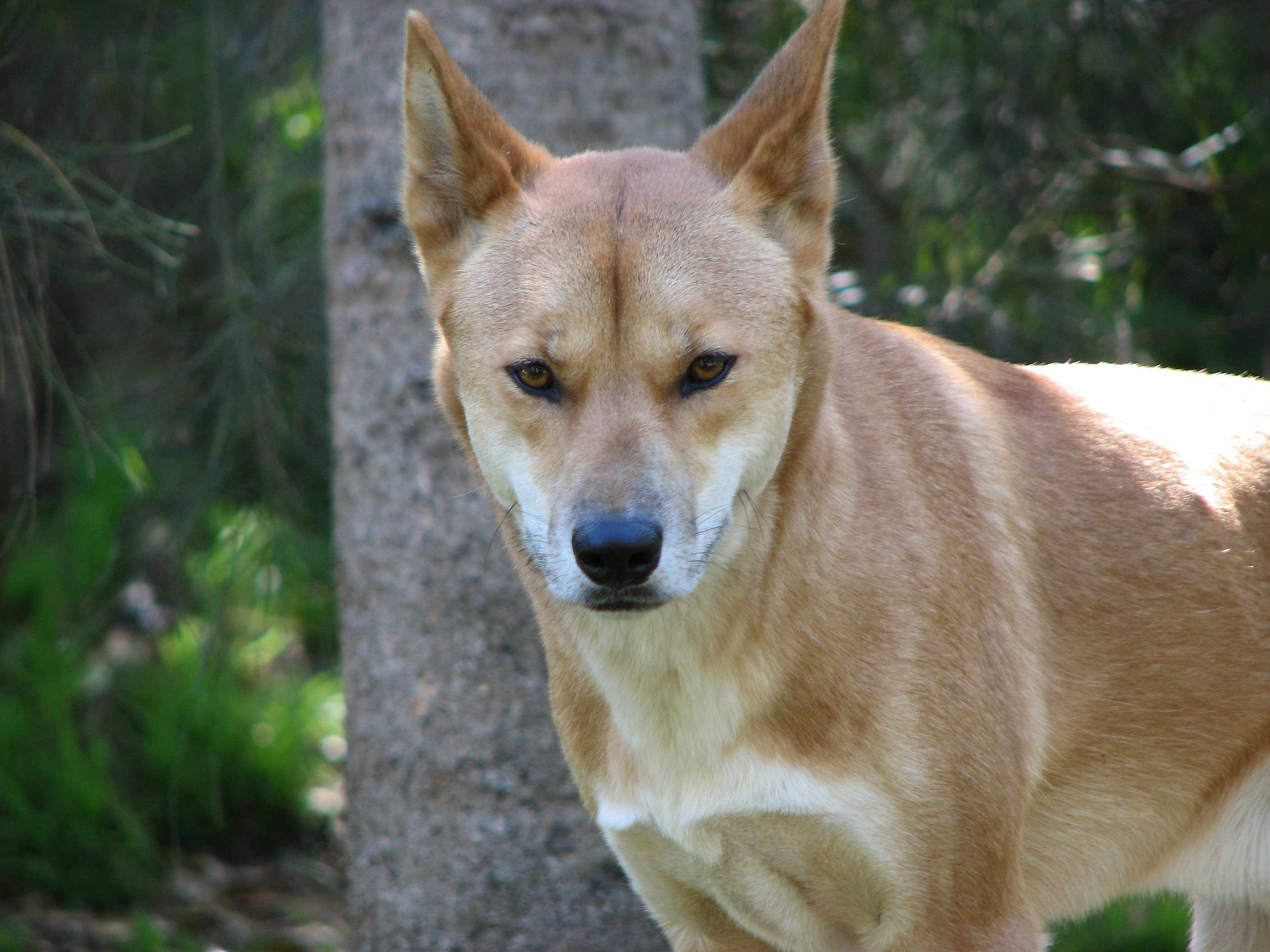
Dingo

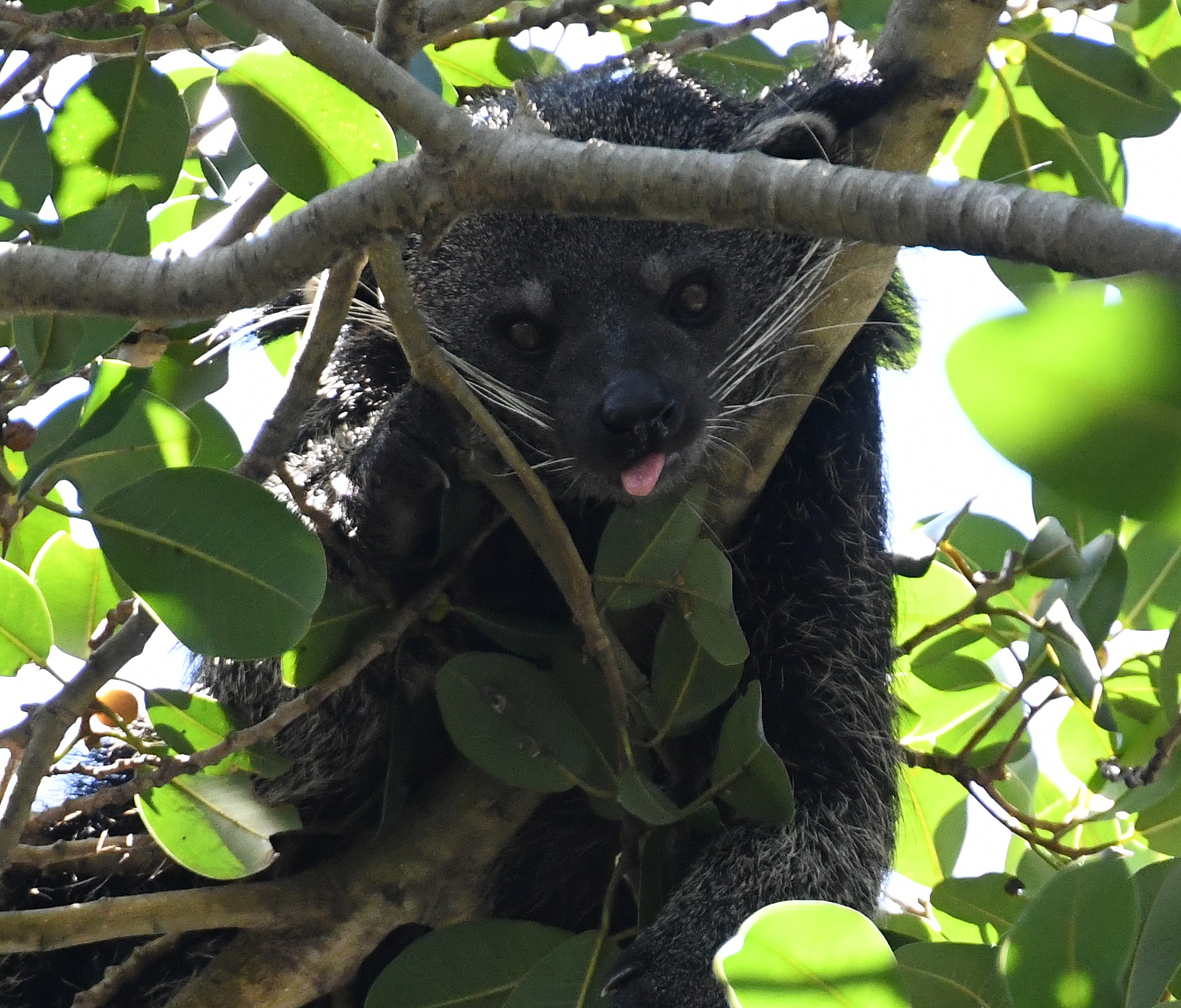
Binturong

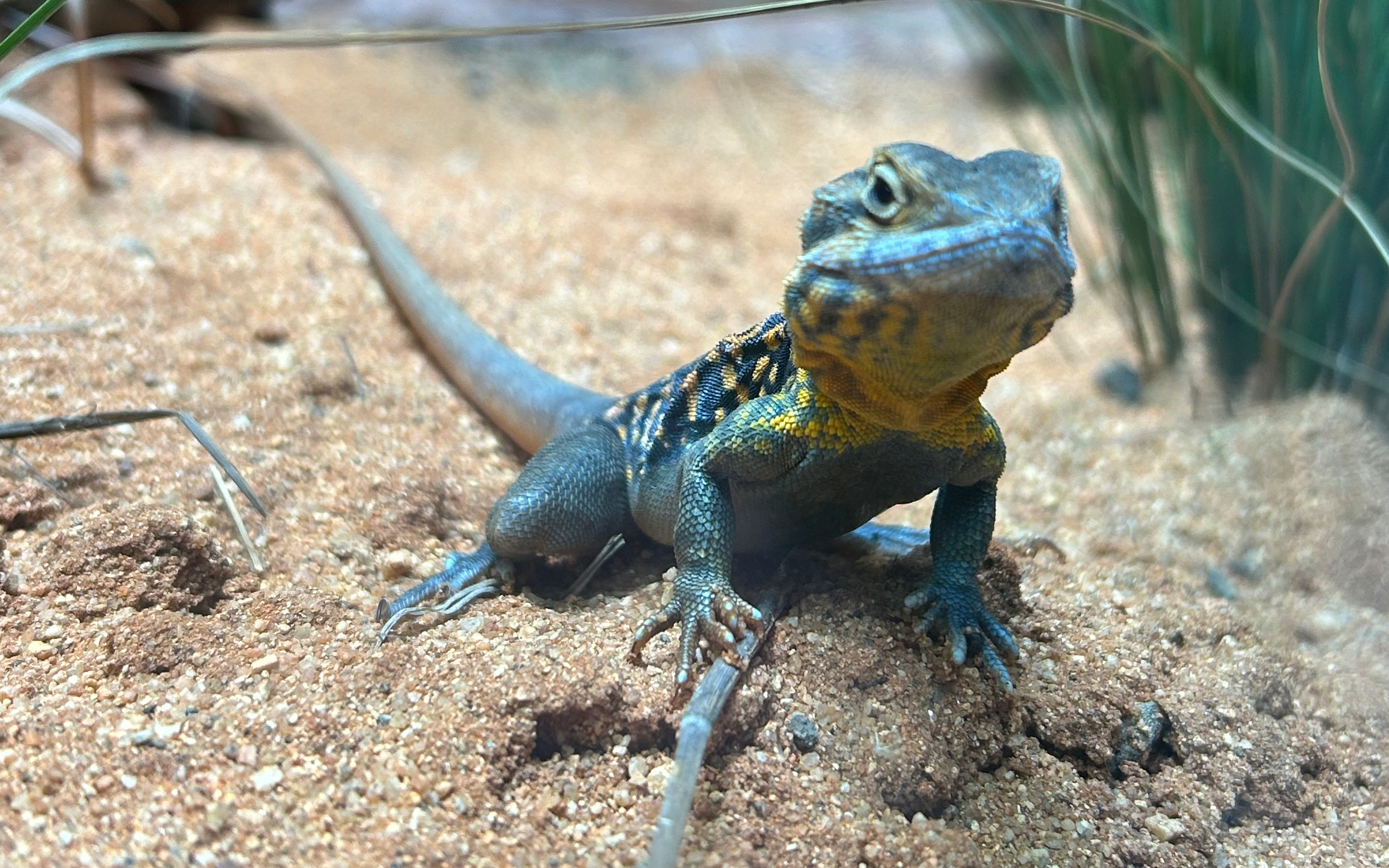
Red-barred dragon

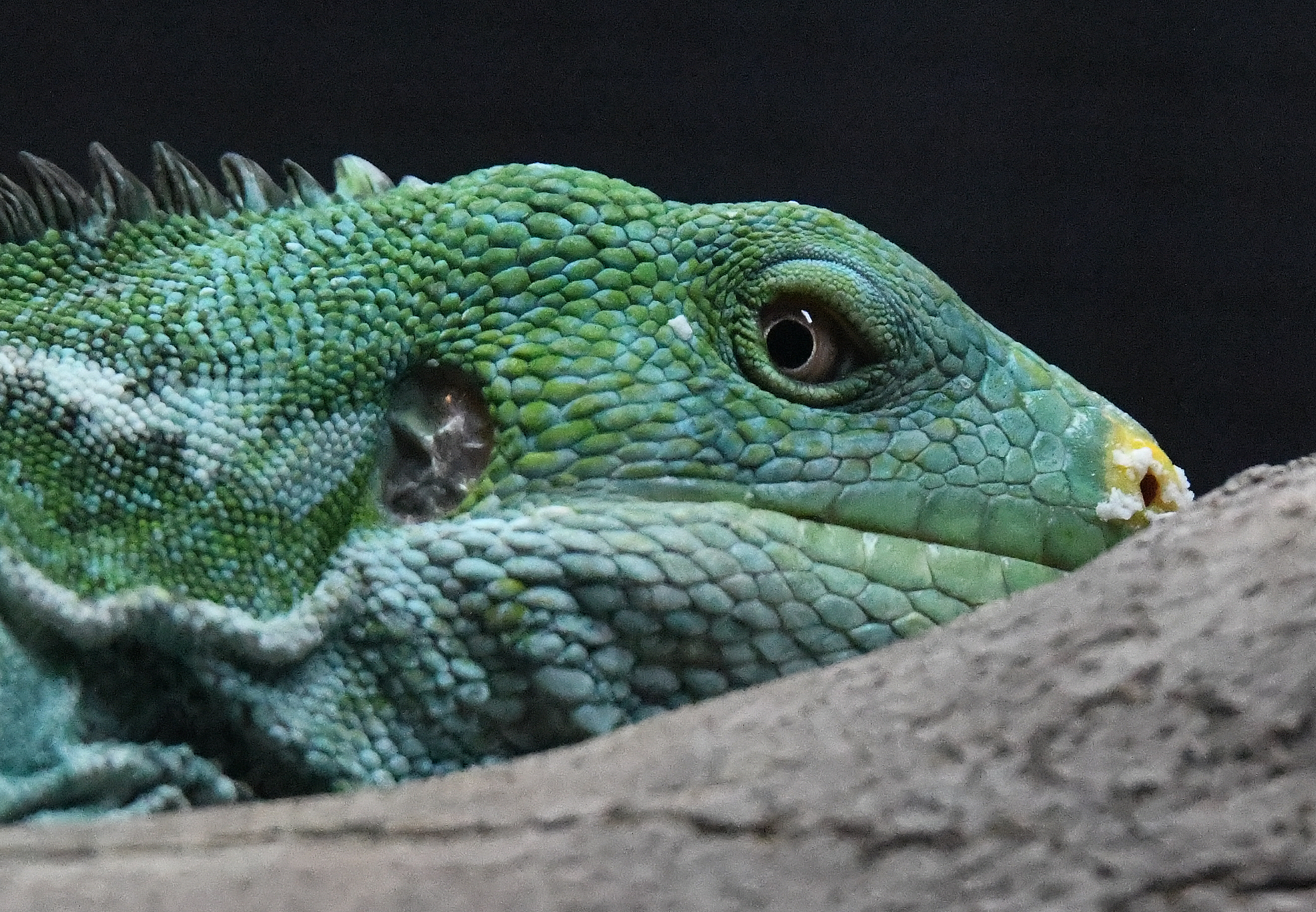
Fijian crested iguana

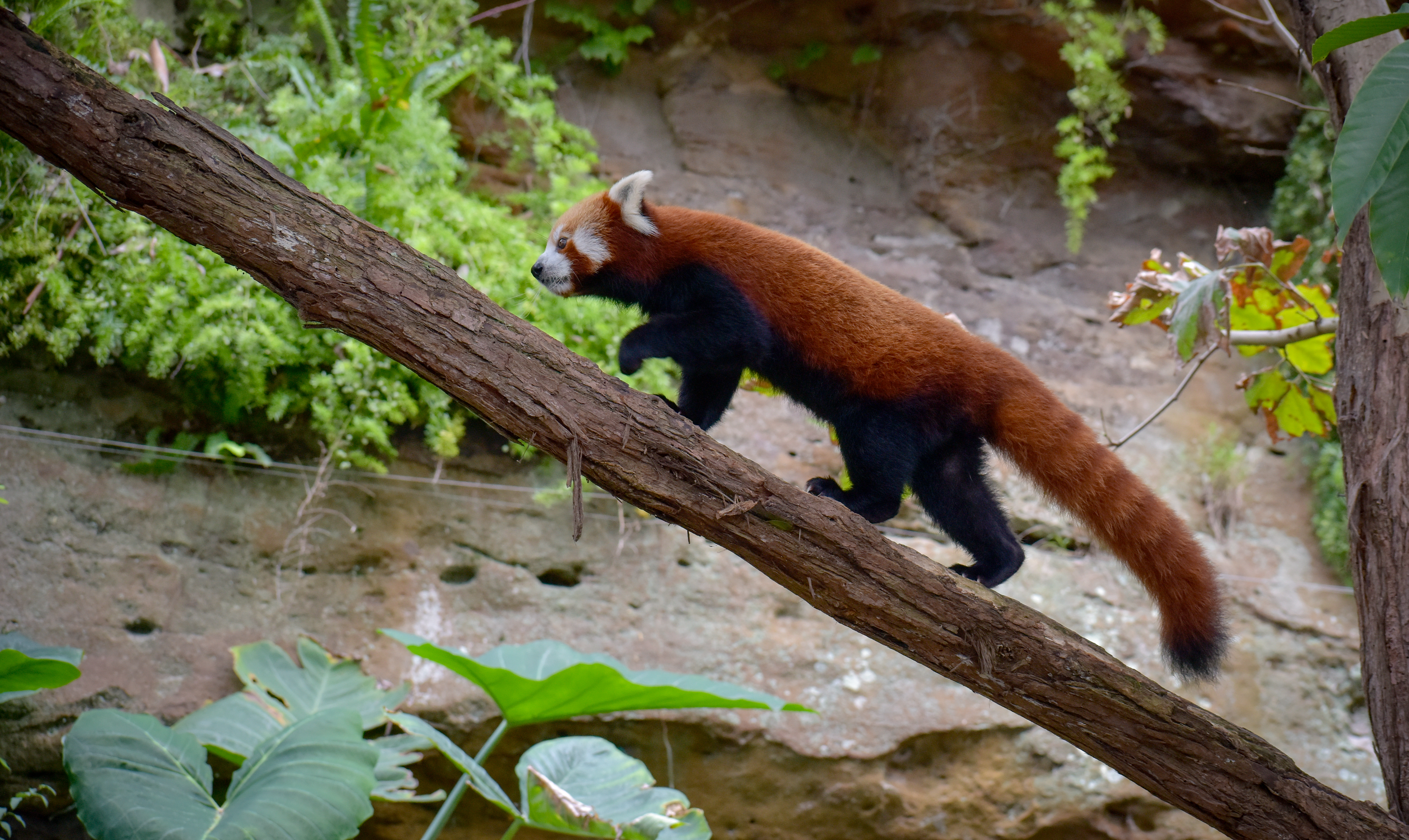
Red panda

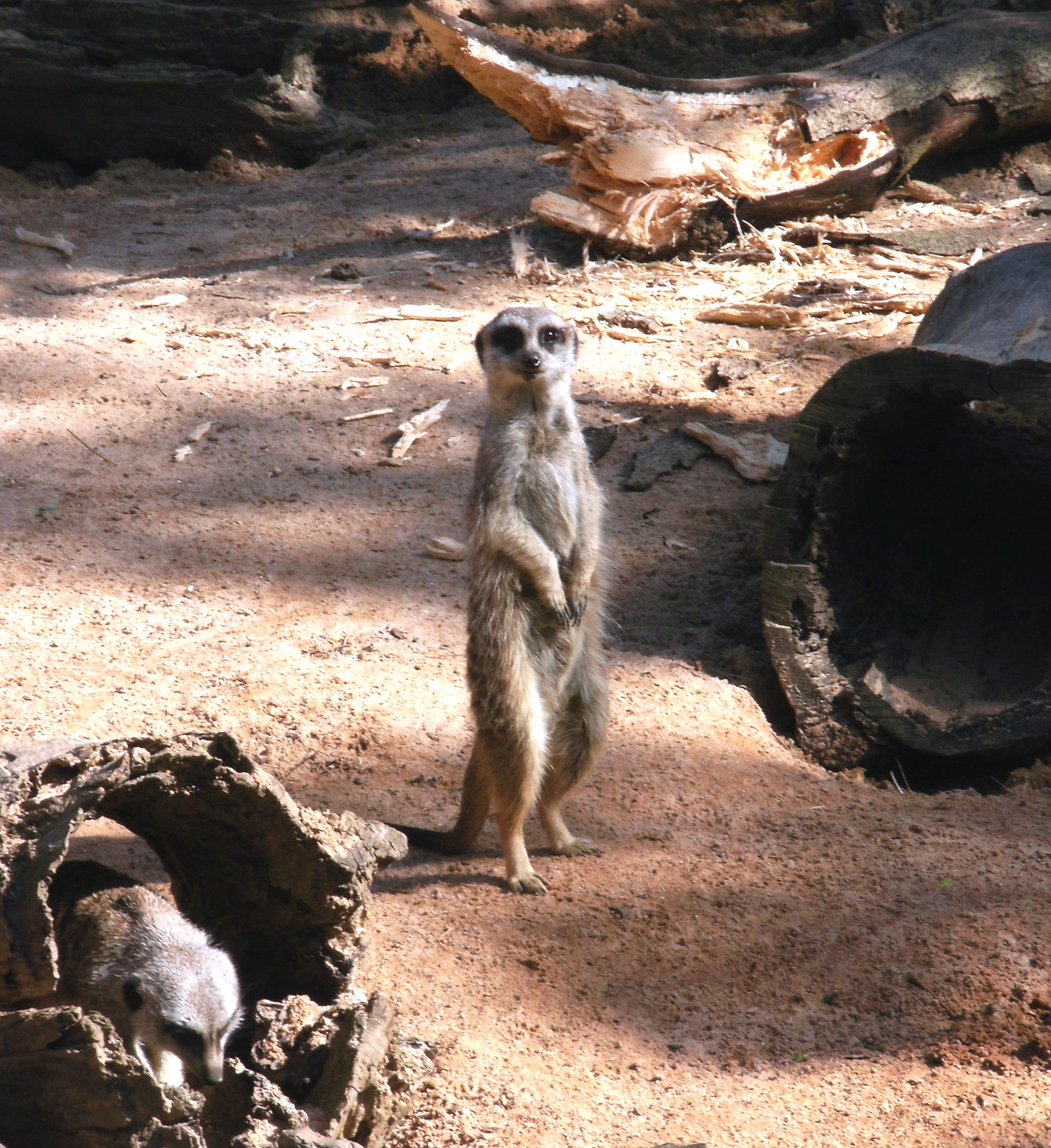
Meerkats

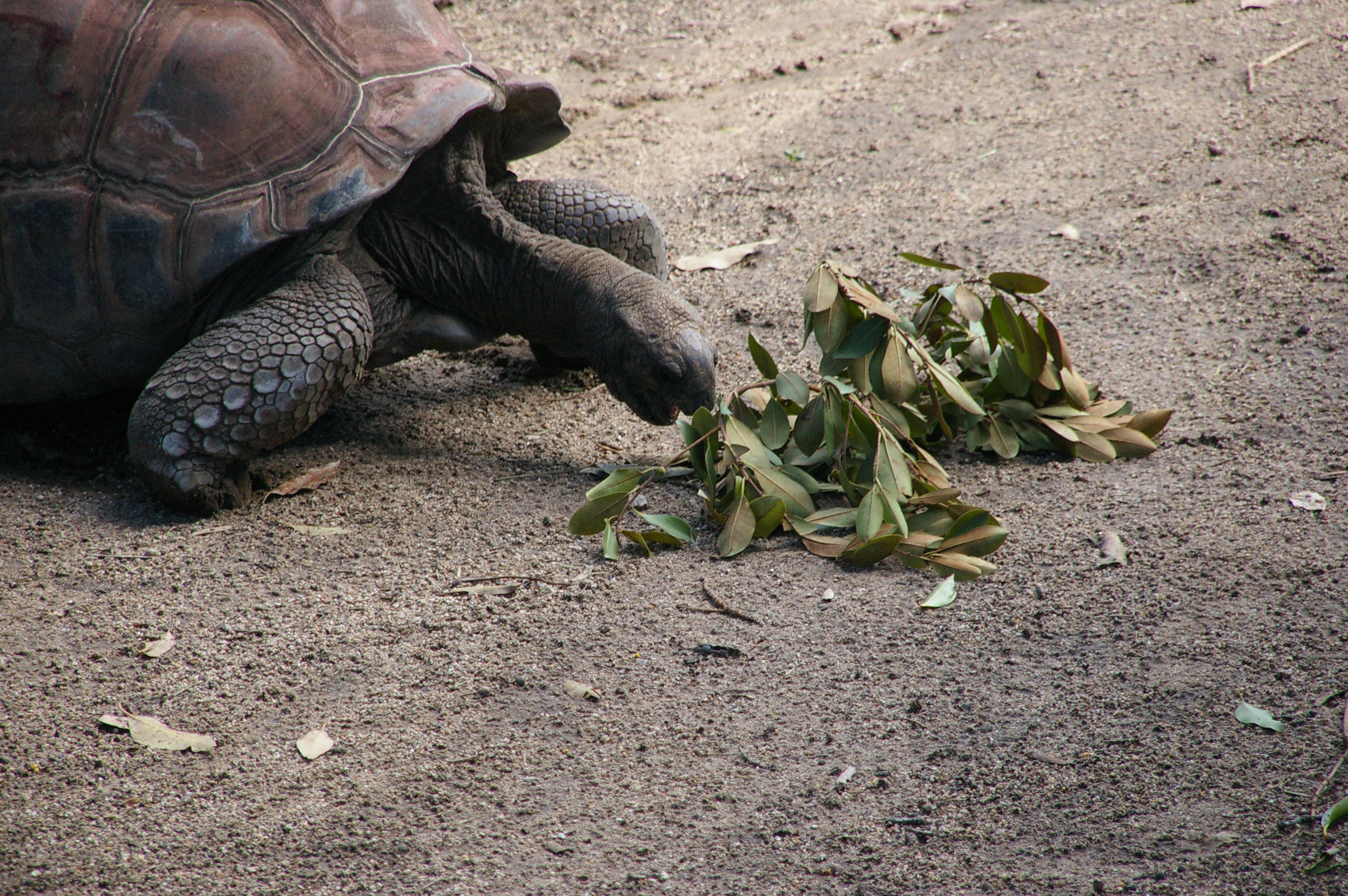
Aldabra giant tortoise

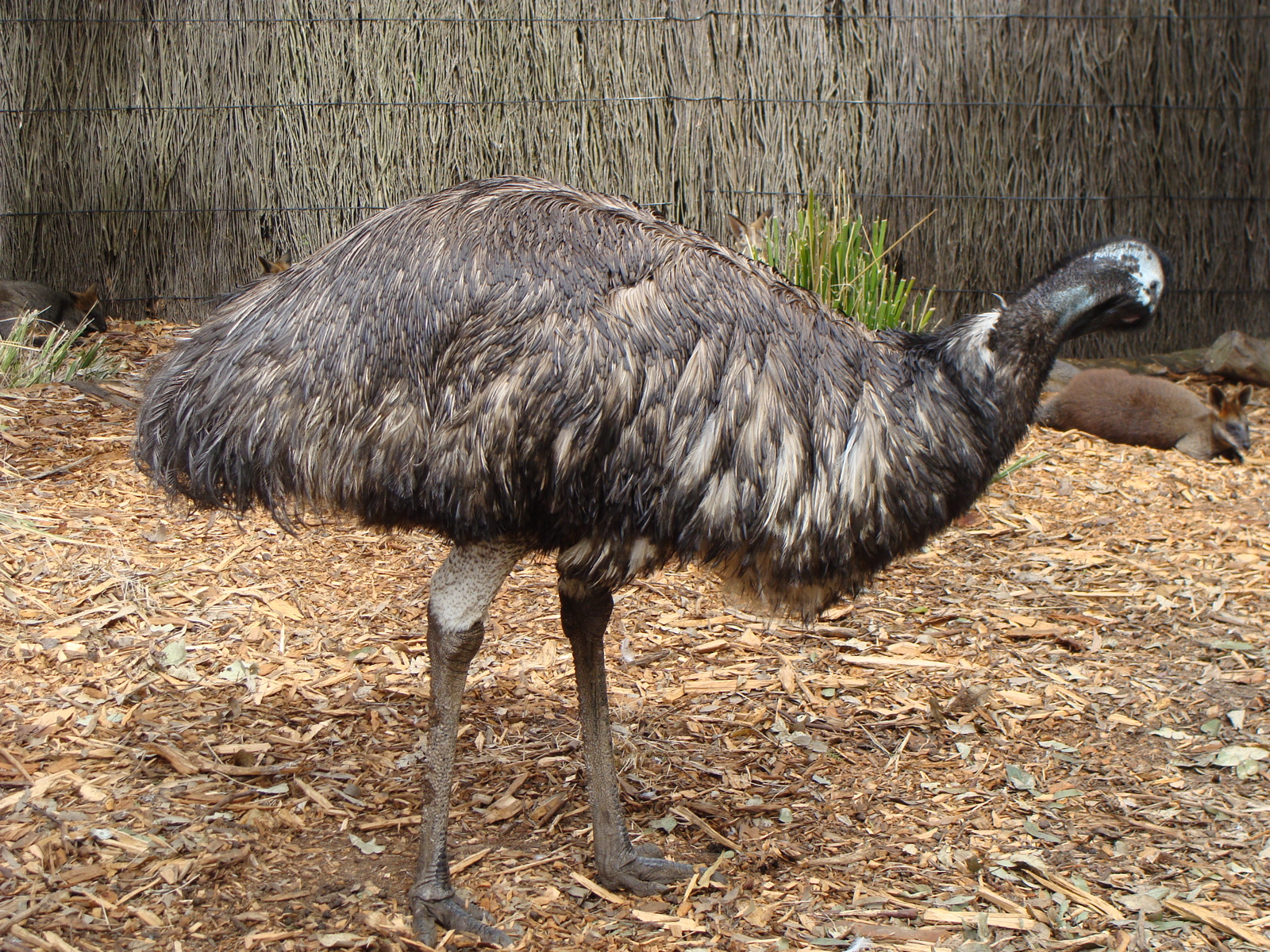
Emu

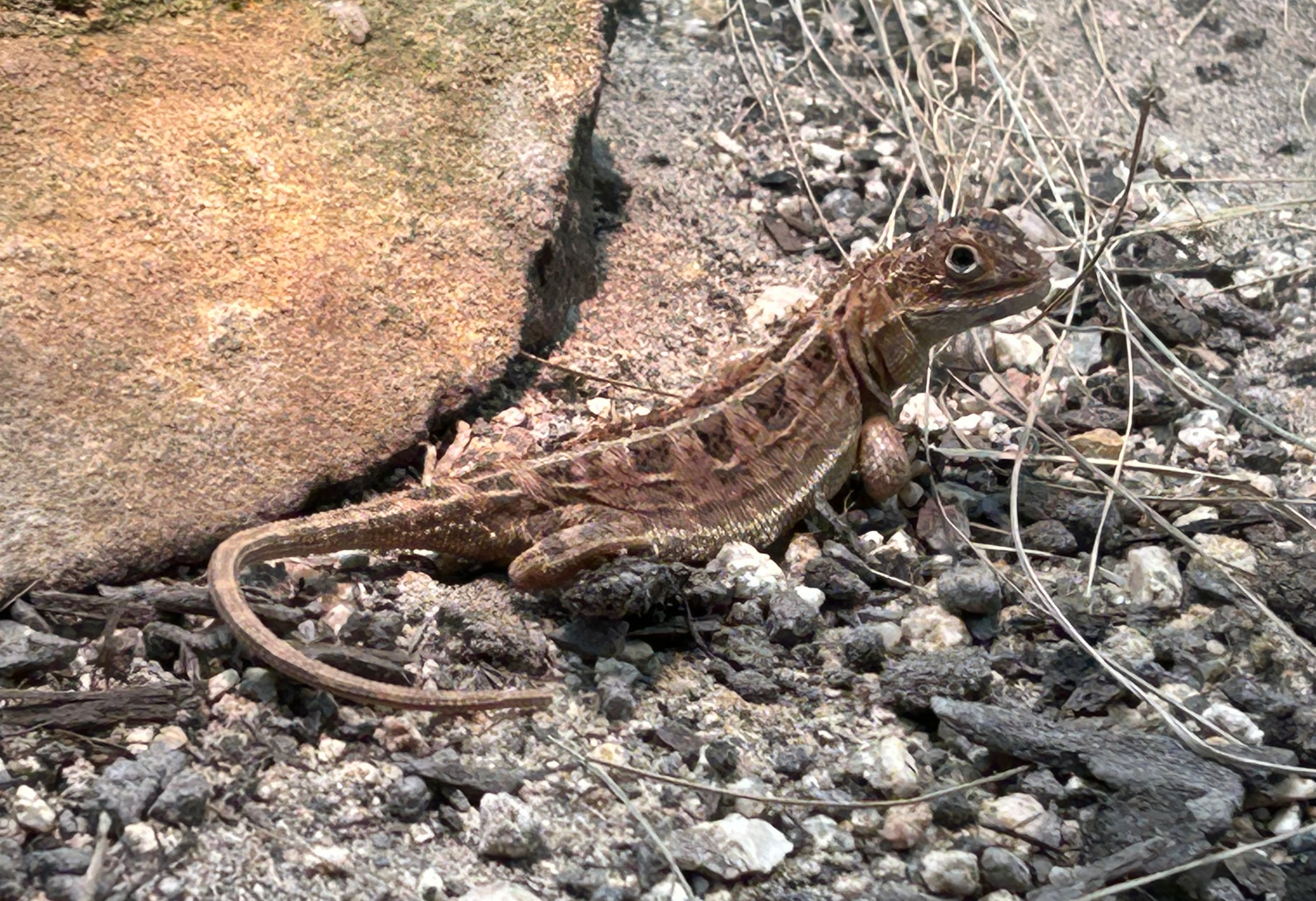
Canberra grassland eared dragon

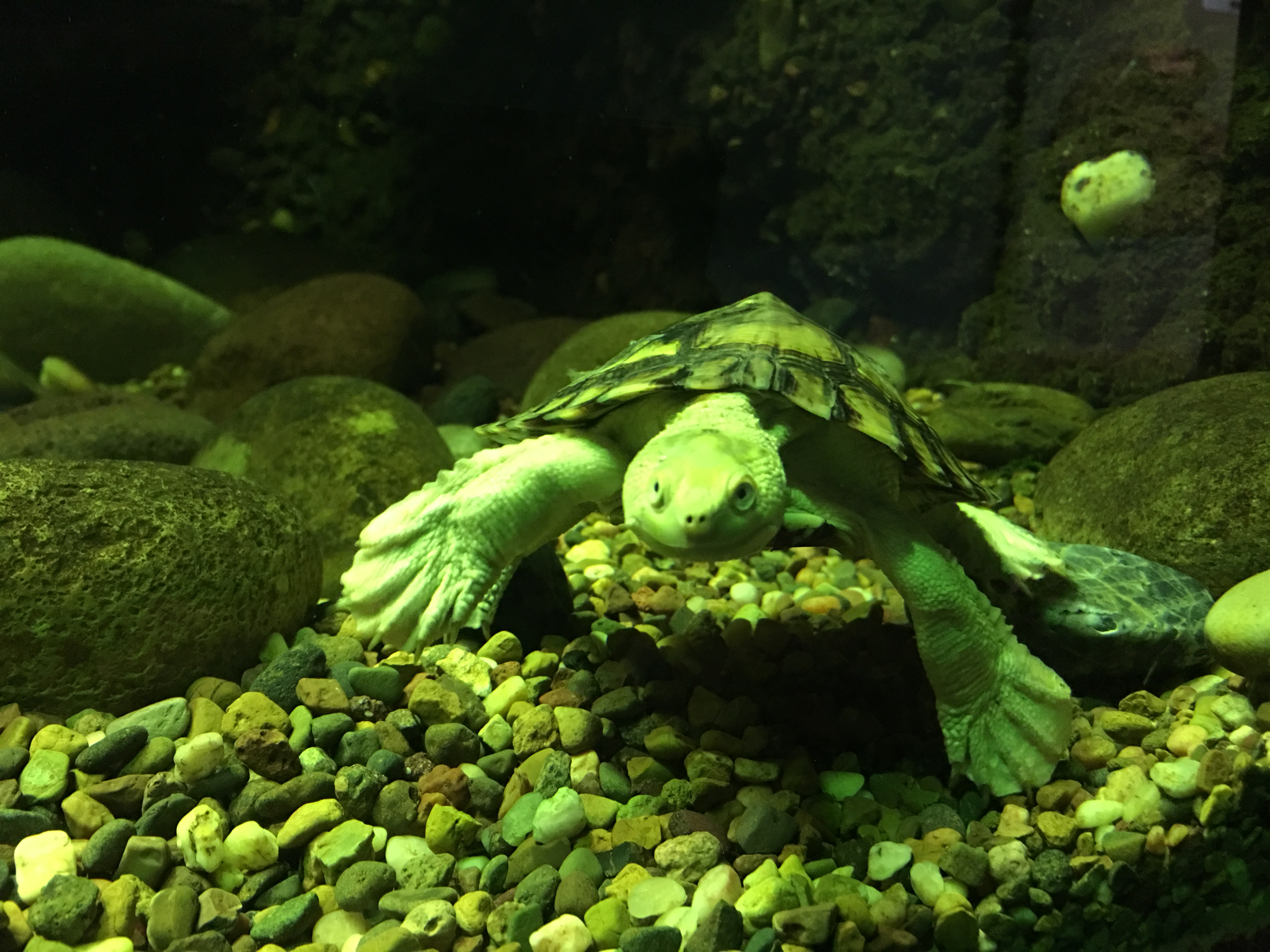
Bellinger River turtle

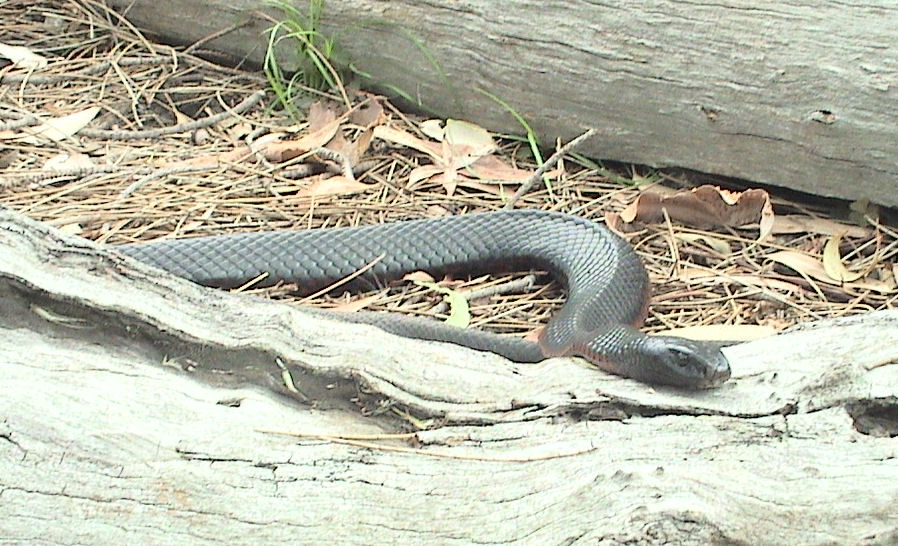
Red-bellied black snake

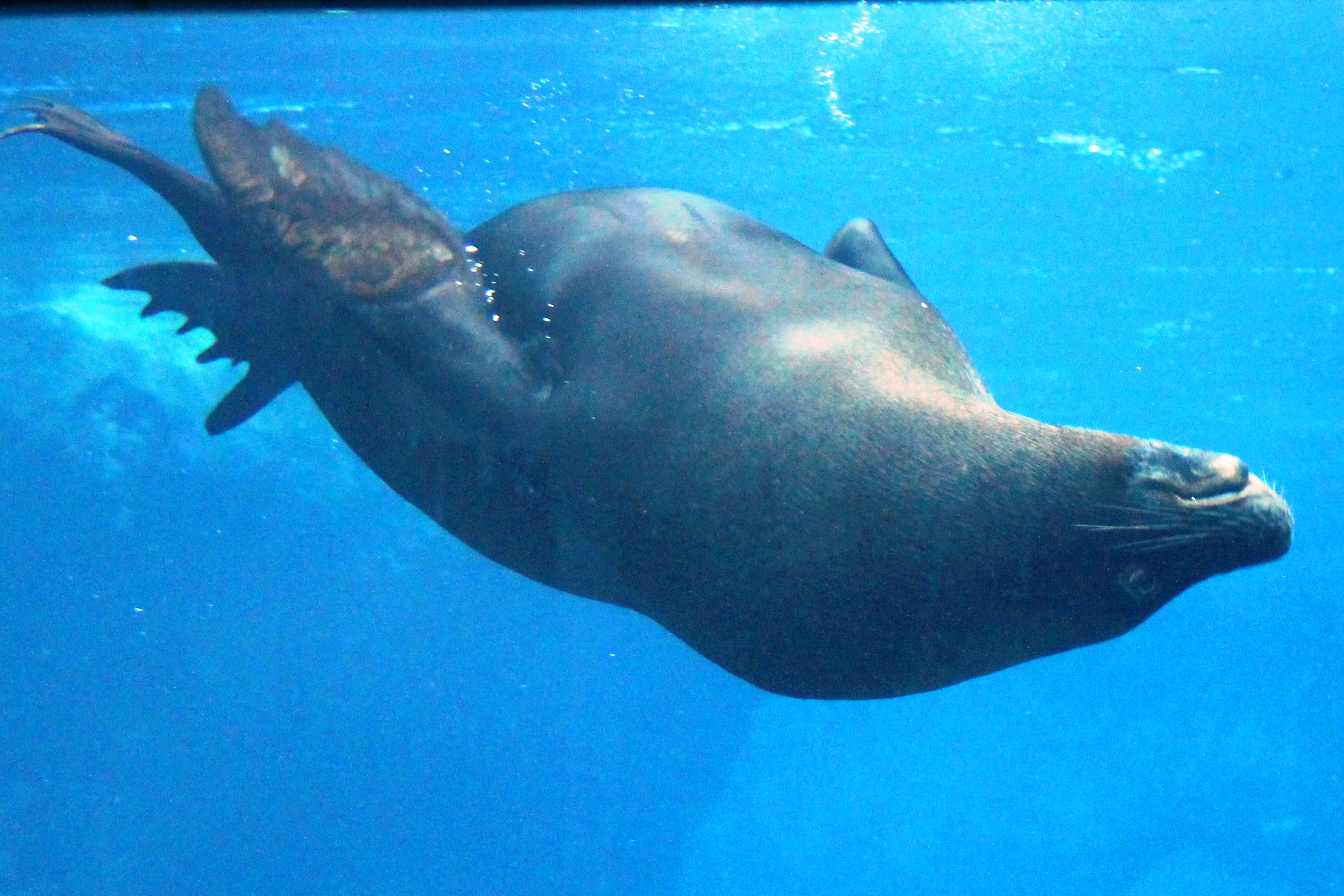
Seal seen through underwater viewing glass

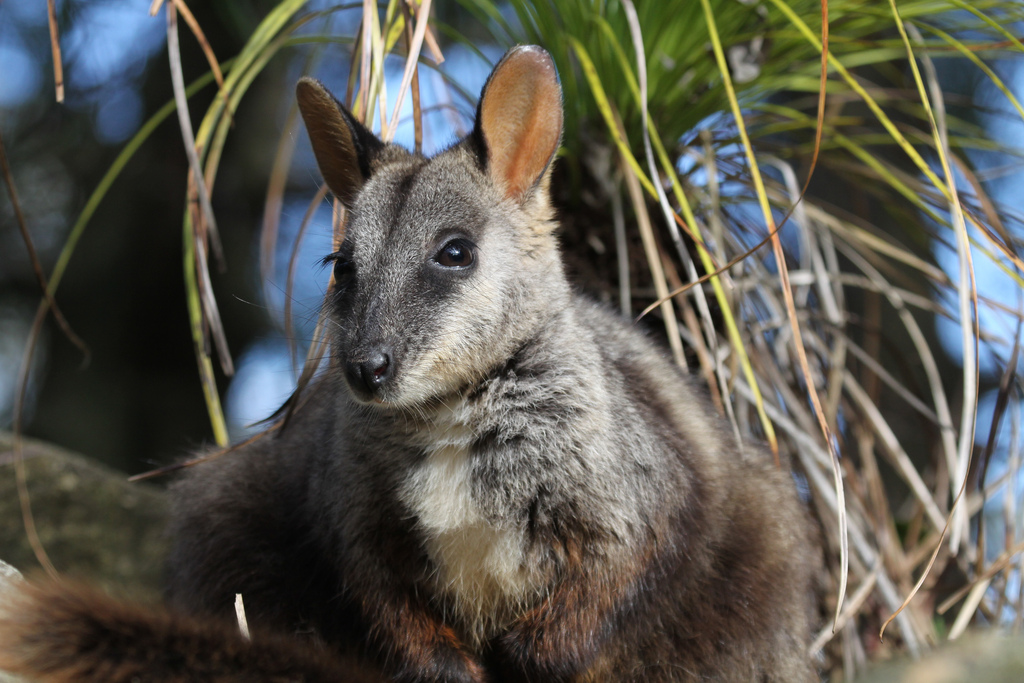
Brush-tailed rock wallaby

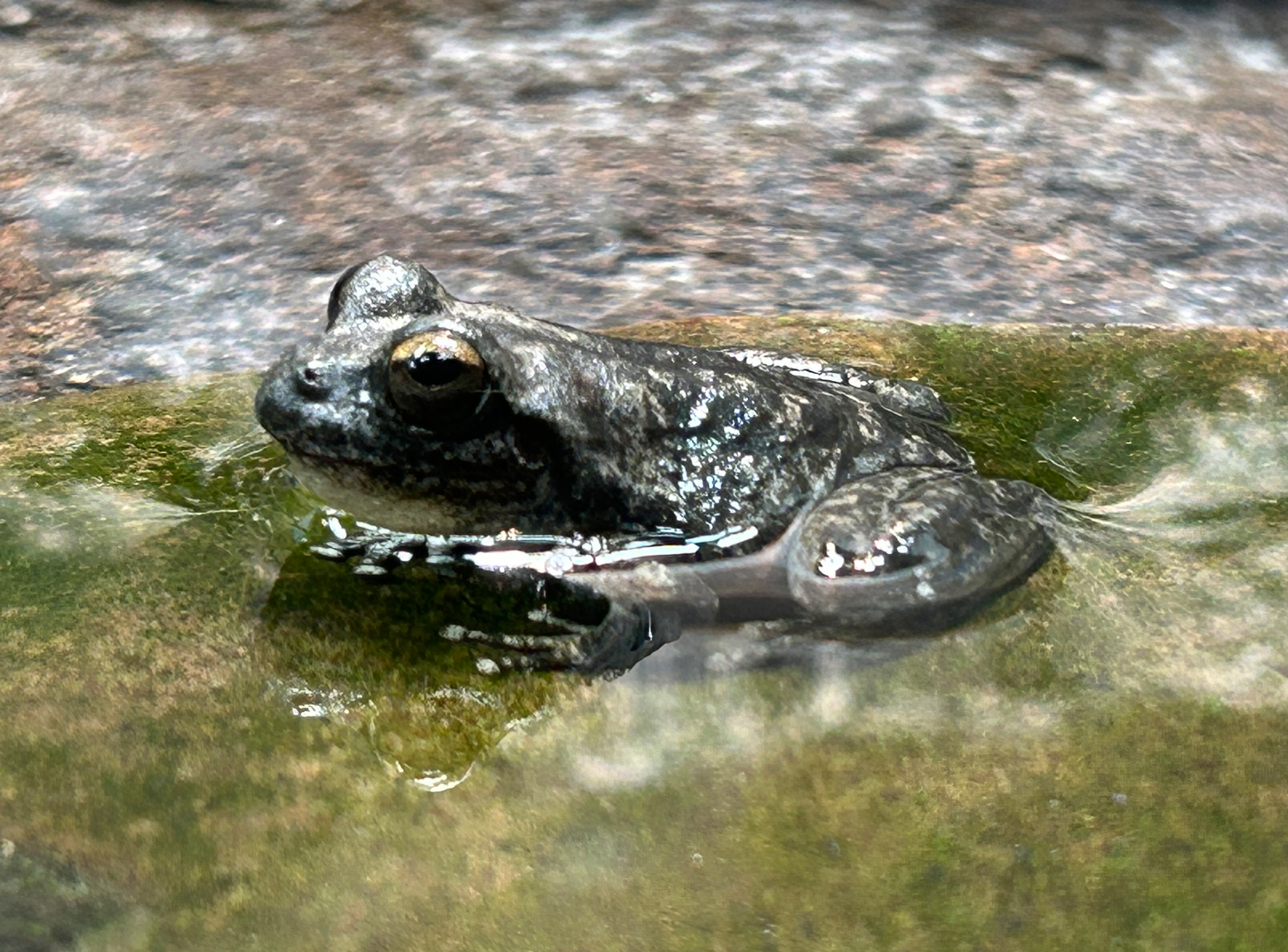
Booroolong frog

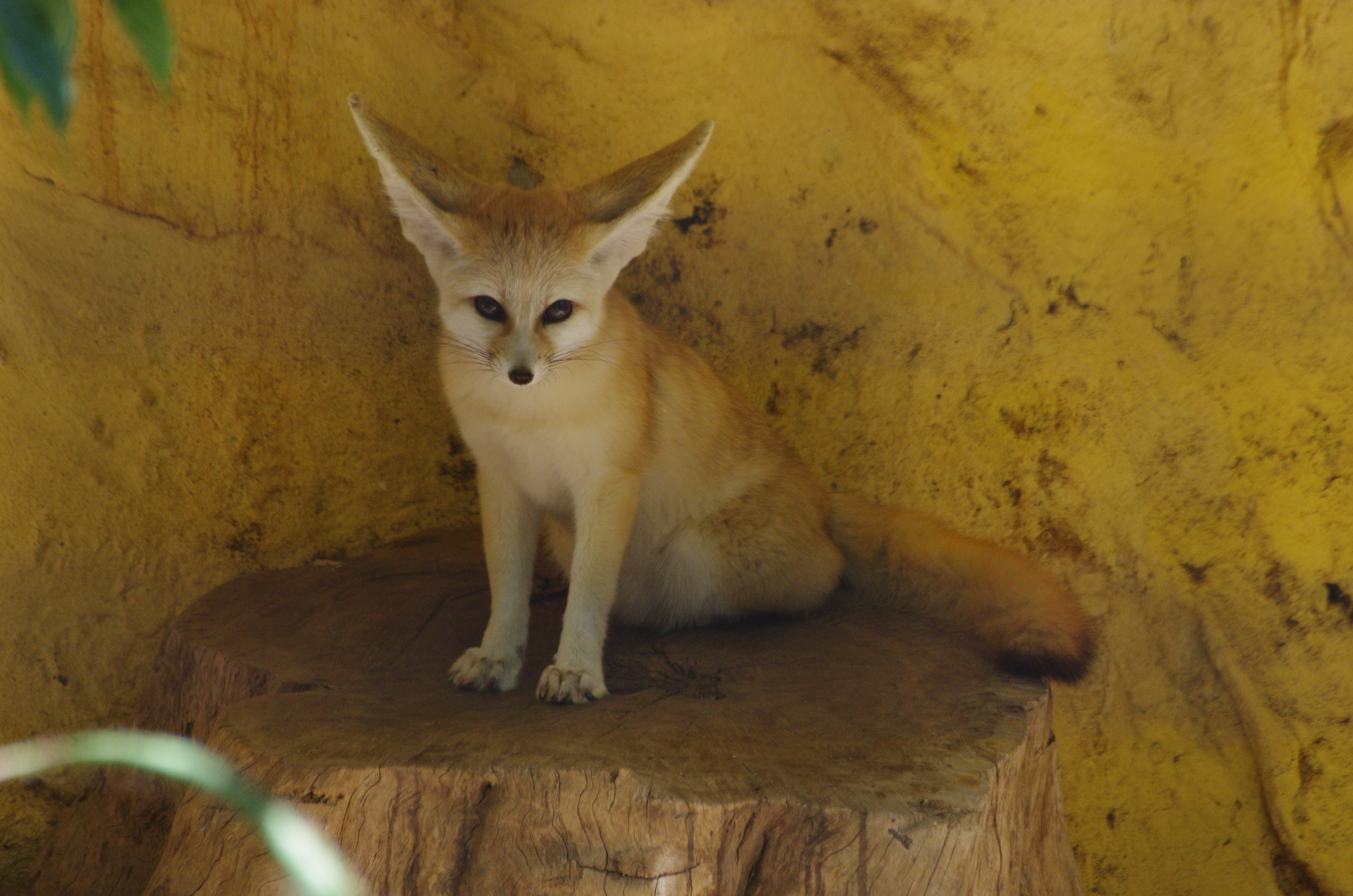
Fennec fox

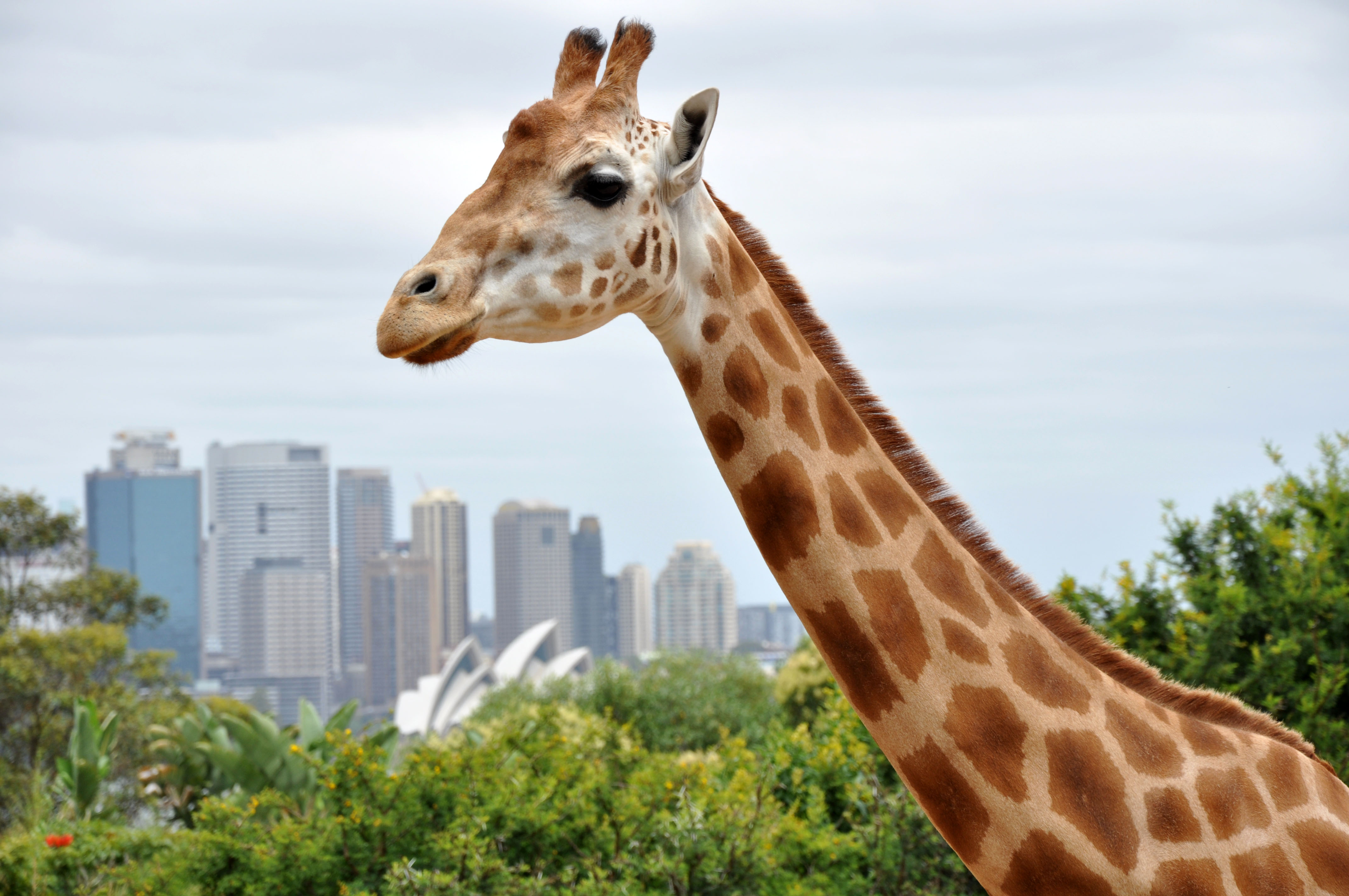
Giraffe

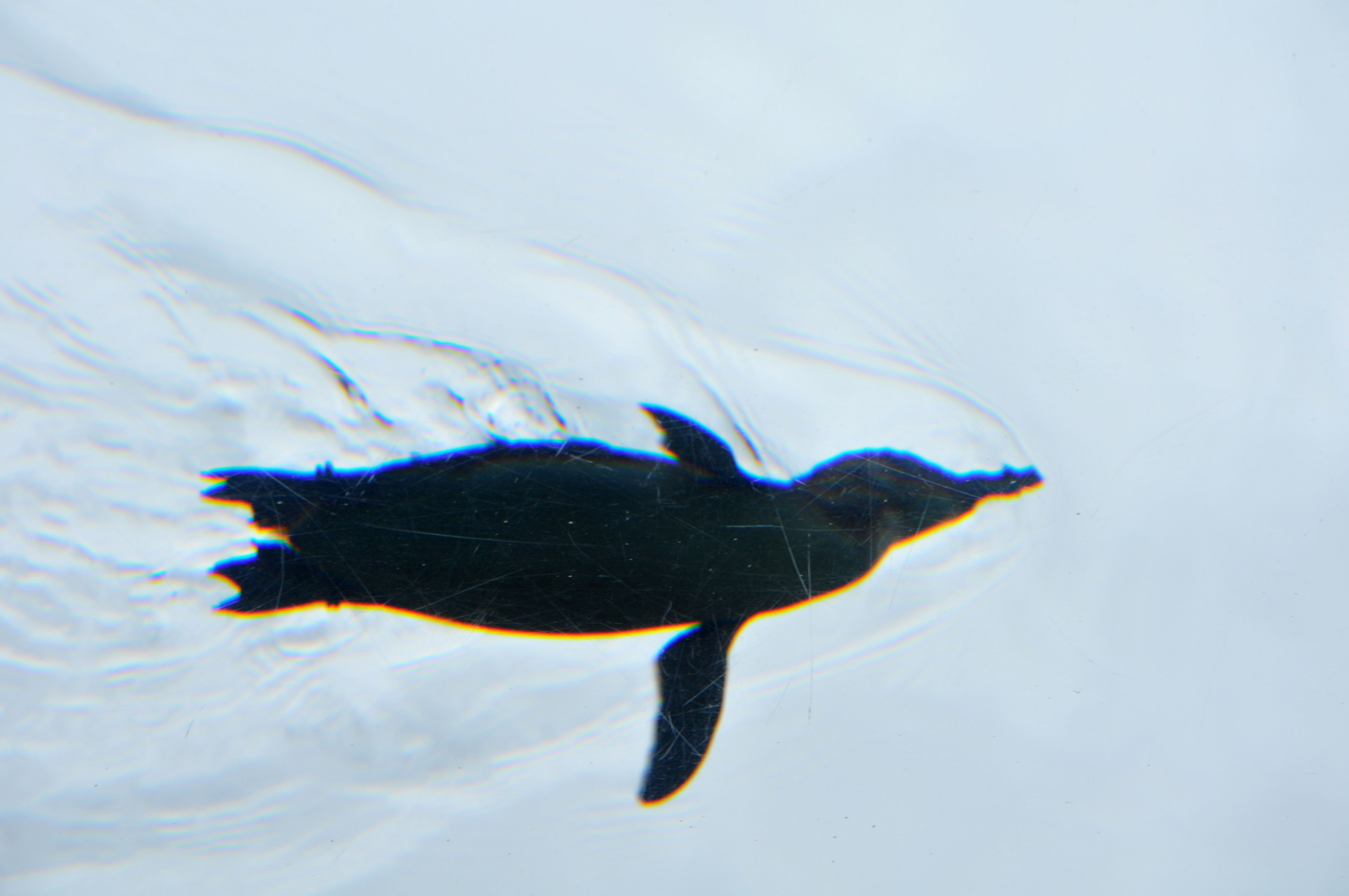
Little penguin

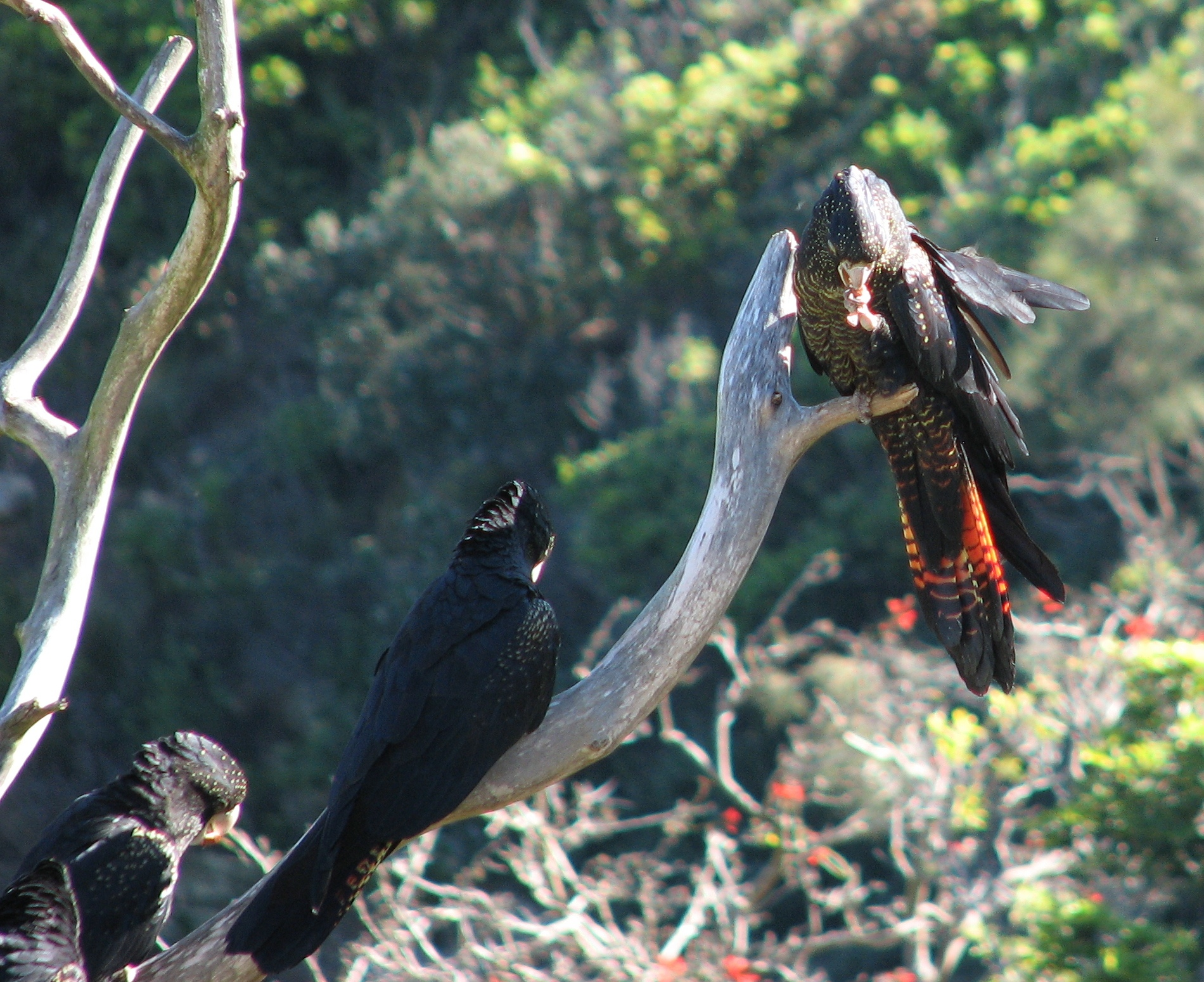
Red-tailed black cockatoo

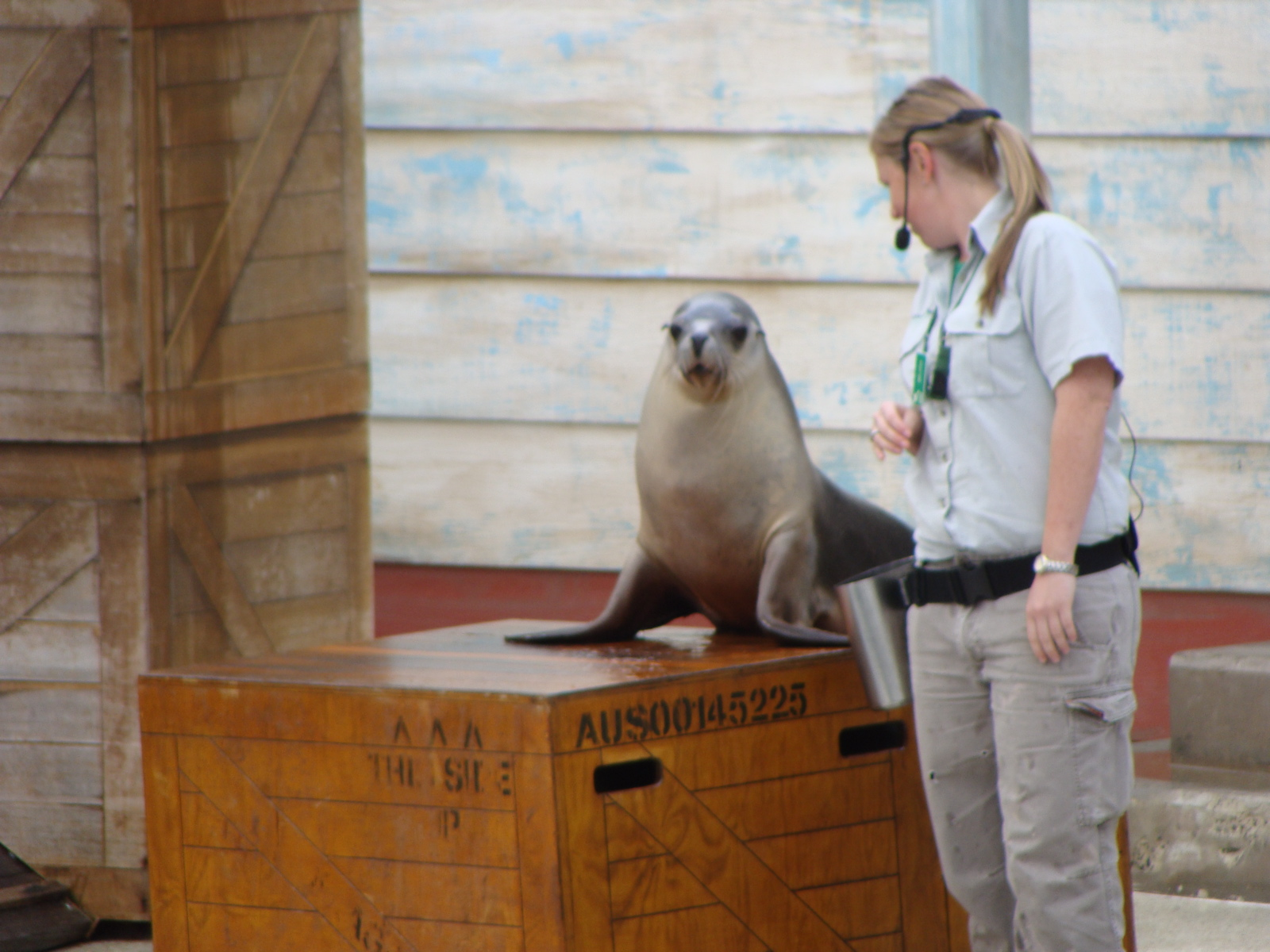
Female Australian sea-lion during a Seals For The Wild Show

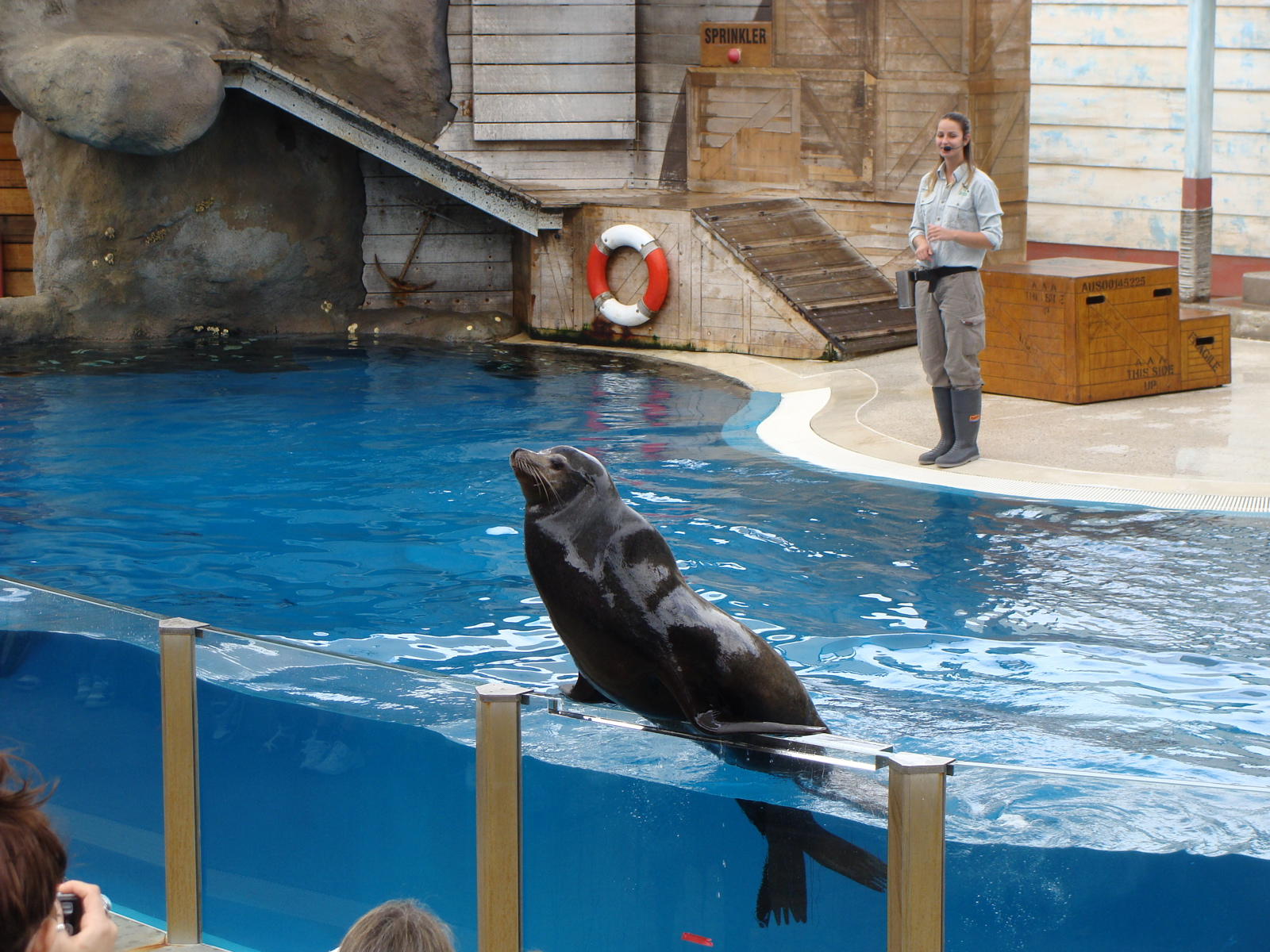
Male California sea lion performing at Seals for the Wild show

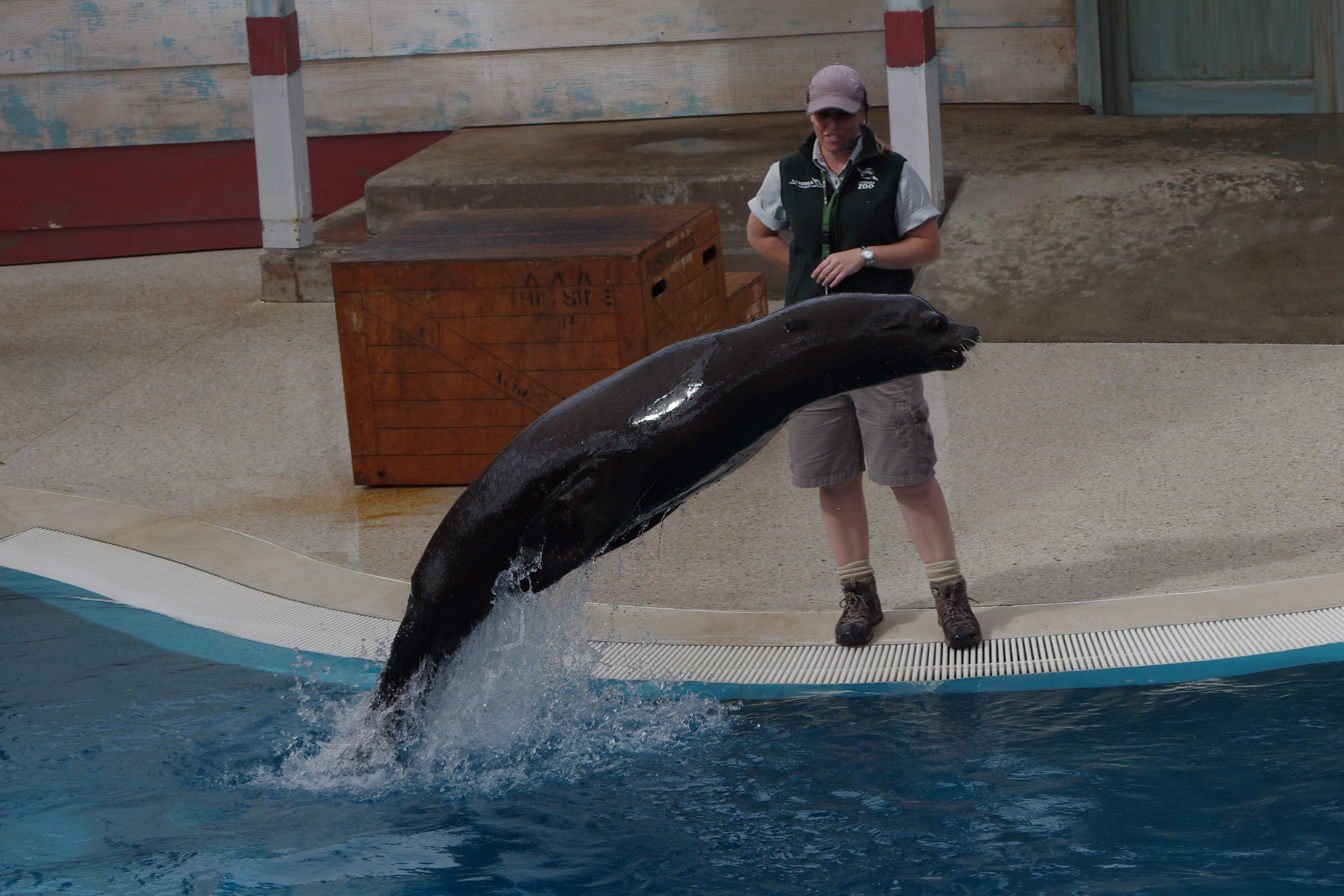
California sea-lion leaping during a Seals For The Wild Show

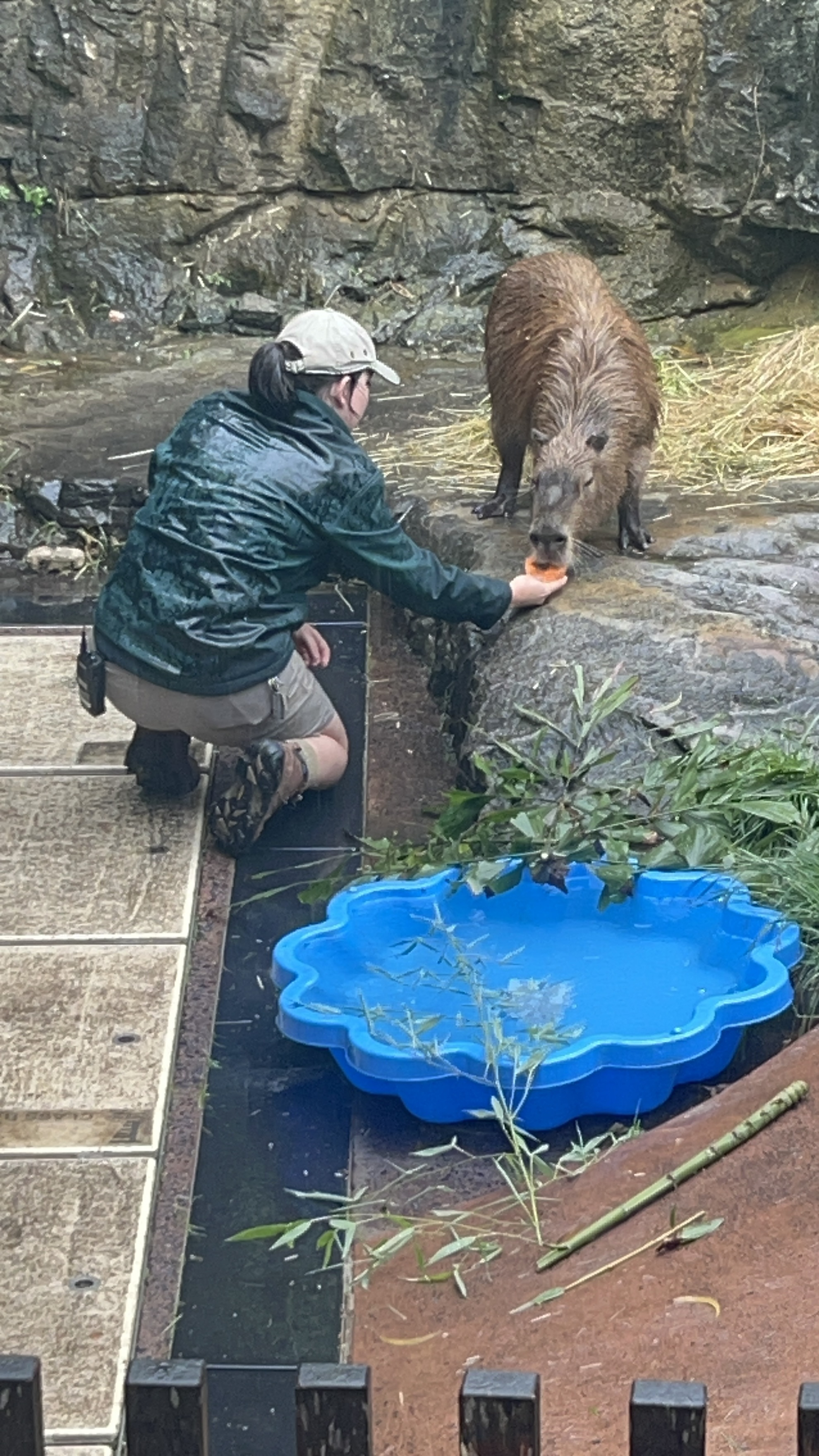
Capybara Feeding at Taronga Zoo

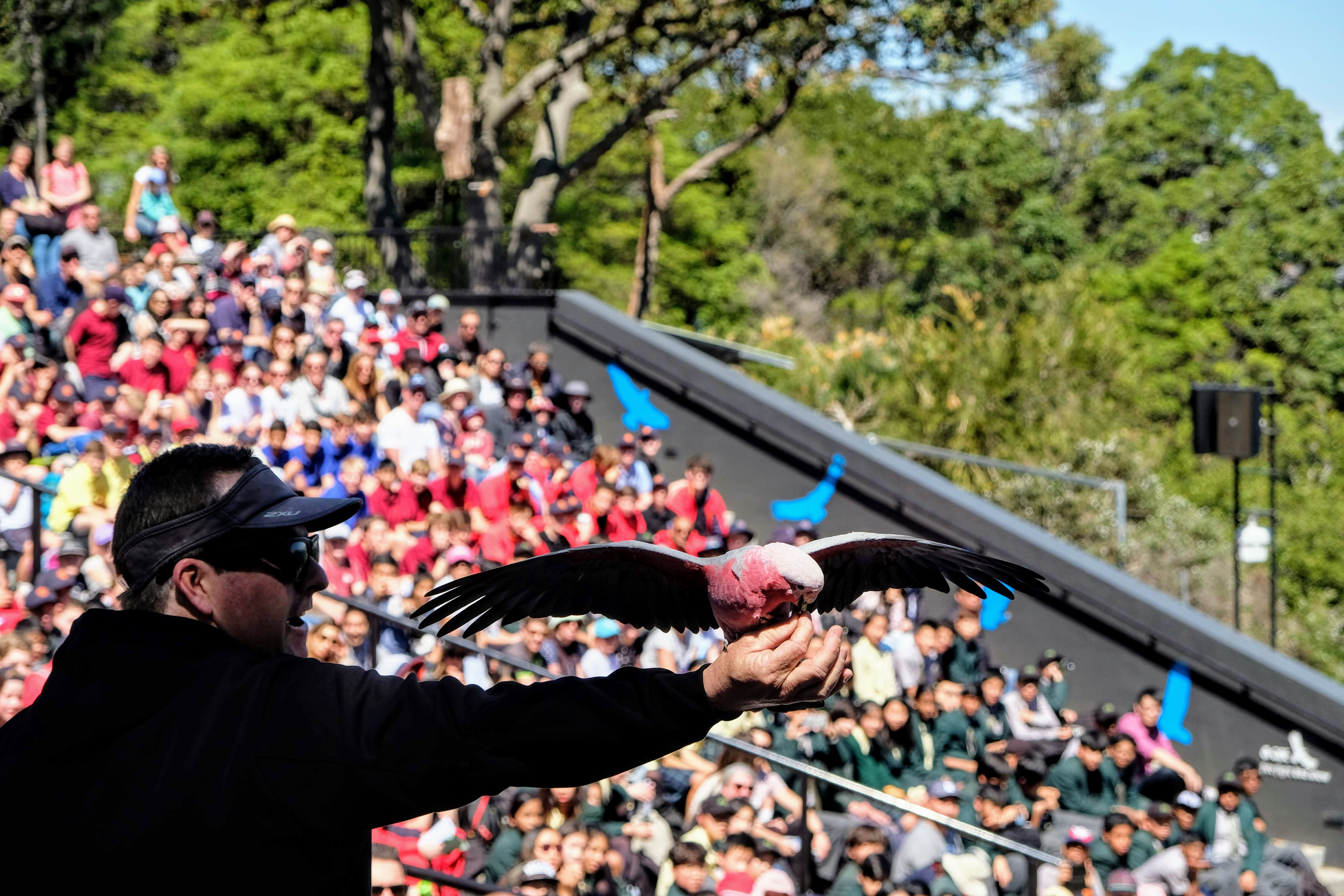
A Galah retrieves a coin during the free flight bird show

== See also ==
- Taronga Conservation Society – Australian research organisation
- Taronga Western Plains Zoo – Zoo in New South Wales, Australia
- Taronga – 1986 novel by Victor Kelleher
- Eve (platypus) – Platypus (2004–2026)
- Luna Park
