= The Infinite Monkey Cage =

Science and comedy radio show

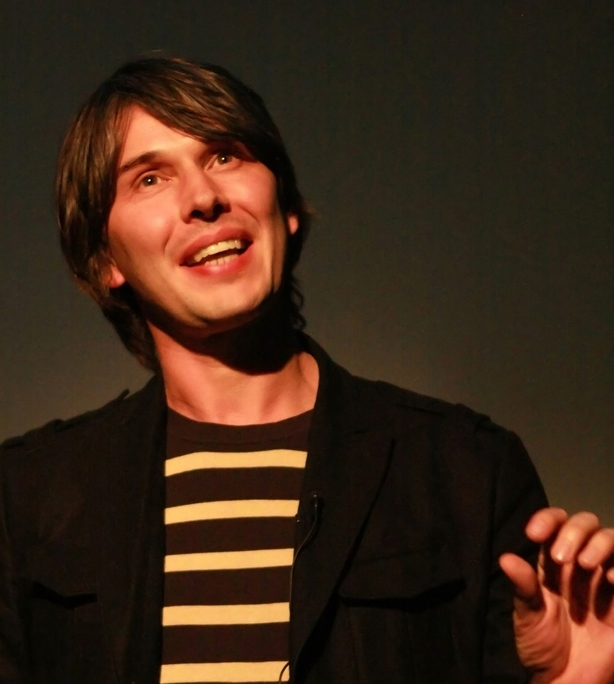
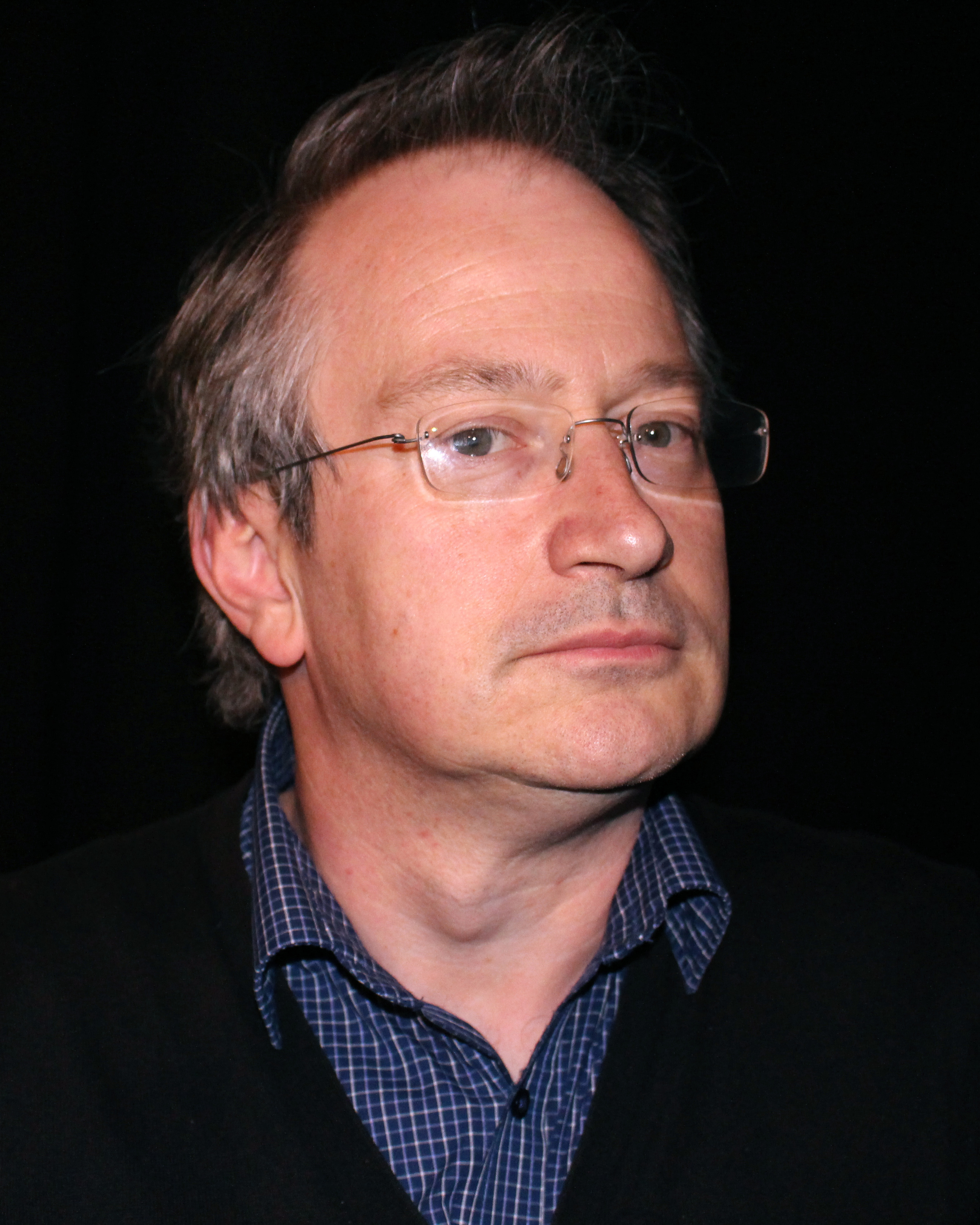
- Brian Cox and Robin Ince, the original hosts of the programme
- Genre: Comedy, popular science
- Running time: approx. 30 minutes
- Country of origin: United Kingdom
- Language: English
- Home station: BBC Radio 4
- Starring: Brian Cox; Robin Ince
- Produced by: Alexandra Feachem
- Executive producer: Deborah Cohen
- Recording studio: Radio Theatre, Broadcasting House, London; RADA Studios, London
- Original release: 30 November 2009
- No. of series: 34
- No. of episodes: 214
- Website: bbc.co.uk/programmes/b00snr0w
- Podcast: bbc.co.uk/programmes/b00snr0w/episodes/downloads.rss

The Infinite Monkey Cage is a BBC Radio 4 comedy and popular science series. Originally hosted by physicist Brian Cox and comedian Robin Ince, The Independent described it as a "witty and irreverent look at the world according to science". Since 2013 the show has been accompanied by a podcast, published immediately after the initial radio broadcast, which features extended versions of most episodes. The programme won a Gold Award in the Best Speech Programme category at the 2011 Sony Radio Awards, and it won the best Radio Talk Show at the 2015 Rose d'Or awards. The name is a reference to the infinite monkey theorem.

Each show has a particular topic up for discussion, with previous topics including the apocalypse and space travel. There are normally three guests; two of these are scientists with an interest in the topic of discussion, offering an expert opinion on the subject. The other guest is usually a comedian, who takes a less serious view of the subject, and often makes the show more accessible by asking the "stupid" questions that the other guests may have overlooked.

Ince resigned from the show in December 2025, citing his off-air views of support of the transgender community and his criticism of Donald Trump being deemed problematic by the BBC.

The 2026 Series of the show is hosted by Adam Rutherford and Jess Fostekew.

== Episodes ==
The following is an episode list of the BBC radio series The Infinite Monkey Cage. As of July 2023, there have been 167 episodes spanning 27 series plus 8 specials; two responding to viewers' questions, Christmas Specials in 2014, 2015, 2016 and 2017 and a 100th Episode special. All episodes are available to stream via the website and as podcast downloads.

Since 2013, podcasts are longer than the broadcast episodes at around 45 minutes, frequently adding mild spats between Cox and Ince, and occasionally language unsuitable "for the 4:30pm school run slot".

In addition to the regular programmes, a special entitled "An Infinite Monkey's Guide to General Relativity" was broadcast in two half-hour episodes on 8 and 15 December 2015. Their 100th Episode (according to their own manner of counting which differs from the one listed on Wikipedia), simply titled "Monkey Cage 100", was also recorded on Video and is currently watchable on the BBC iPlayer.

=== Series overview ===
Series	Episodes	Originally released	
Series	Episodes	First released	Last released
1	4	30 November 2009	21 December 2009
2	4	14 June 2010	5 July 2010
3	4	15 November 2010	6 December 2010
4	6	30 May 2011	5 July 2011
5	6	21 November 2011	26 December 2011
6	6	18 June 2012	23 July 2012
7	6	19 November 2012	24 December 2012
8	6	24 June 2013	29 July 2013
9	7	18 November 2013	9 March 2014
10	7	7 July 2014	25 December 2014
11	6	19 January 2015	23 February 2015
12	7	6 July 2015	25 December 2015
Christmas	2	8 December 2015	15 December 2015
13	7	11 January 2016	22 February 2016
14	7	4 July 2016	27 December 2016
15	6	16 January 2017	20 February 2017
16	7	3 July 2017	25 December 2017
17	6	8 January 2018	12 February 2018
Television		11 July 2018	
18	5	16 July 2018	13 August 2018
19	6	7 January 2019	11 February 2019
Moon landing		19 July 2019	
20	5	16 September 2019	14 October 2019
21	6	13 January 2020	17 February 2020
22	9	25 May 2020	20 July 2020
23	6	11 January 2021	15 February 2021
24	7	25 June 2022	6 August 2022
25	7	12 November 2022	24 December 2022
26	6	18 February 2023	25 March 2023
27	7	24 June 2023	5 August 2023
28	7	11 November 2023	23 December 2023
29	6	17 February 2024	23 March 2024
30	7	10 July 2024	21 August 2024
31	7	13 November 2024	25 December 2024
32	6	19 February 2025	26 March 2025
33	7	10 July 2025	21 August 2025
34	7	20 November 2025	25 December 2025

=== Series 1 (2009) ===
No. overall	No. in series	Title	Guest(s)	Original release date
1	1	"Science and Comedians"	Dara Ó Briain & Dr Alice Roberts	30 November 2009
2	2	"Extraterrestrial Life"	Jon Ronson & Seth Shostak	7 December 2009
3	3	"Quantum Physics"	Ben Miller	14 December 2009
4	4	"Science and Religion"	Chris Addison, Victor Stock & Adam Rutherford	21 December 2009

=== Series 2 (2010) ===
No. overall	No. in series	Title	Guests	Original release date
5	1	"Popular Science"	Ben Miller & Robert Winston	14 June 2010
6	2	"Trust me, I'm a Scientist"	Ben Goldacre, Claudia Hammond & Dave Gorman	21 June 2010
7	3	"Science Fiction, Science Fact"	Jonathan Ross, Alan Moore & Dr Brian Greene	28 June 2010
8	4	"Things Can Only Get Better?"	Colin Blakemore, Mark Steel & Peter Cunnah	5 July 2010

=== Series 3 (2010) ===
No. overall	No. in series	Title	Guests	Original release date
9	1	"Apocalypse"	Adam Rutherford, Andy Hamilton & Dr Lucie Green with Matt Parker	15 November 2010
10	2	"Modern World"	Paul Foot, Aleks Krotoski & Professor Tony Ryan with Matt Parker	22 November 2010
11	3	"Randomness"	Tim Minchin & Alex Bellos with Matt Parker	29 November 2010
12	4	"Philosophy"	Alexei Sayle, Julian Baggini & Professor Raymond Tallis with Matt Parker	6 December 2010

=== Series 4 (2011) ===
No. overall	No. in series	Title	Guests	Original release date
13	1	"What Don't We Know?"	Paul Foot, Marcus Chown & Professor Steve Jones	30 May 2011
14	2	"Six Degrees"	Stephen Fry, Simon Singh, & Aleks Krotoski with Matt Parker	6 June 2011
15	3	"So You Want To Be an Astronaut?"	Chris Riley, Dr Kevin Fong, & Helen Keen	13 June 2011
16	4	"Is Cosmology Really a Science?"	Alan Moore, Dallas Campbell, Professor Ed Copeland & Helen Arney	20 June 2011
This programme was recorded as part of the Cheltenham Science Festival.
17	5	"Is There Room for Mysticism in a Rational World?"	Billy Bragg, Graham Coxon, Shappi Khorsandi & Professor Tony Ryan	27 June 2011
18	6	"Science vs the Supernatural: Does Science Kill the Magic?"	Andy Nyman, Richard Wiseman & Bruce Hood	5 July 2011

=== Series 5 (2011) ===
No. overall	No. in series	Title	Guests	Original release date
19	1	"What's the North Ever Done for Us?"	Jon Culshaw, Jeff Forshaw & Matthew Cobb	21 November 2011
20	2	"A Balanced Programme on Balance"	Sir Paul Nurse, Katy Brand, Simon Mayo, & Professor Steve Jones	28 November 2011
21	3	"The Origins of Life"	Tim Minchin, Dr Nick Lane, & Adam Rutherford	5 December 2011
22	4	"The Science of Sound"	Tom Wrigglesworth, Professor Trevor Cox & Professor Chris Plack	12 December 2011
23	5	"I'm a Chemist Get Me Out of Here"	Dara Ó Briain, Professor Tony Ryan, & Andrea Sella	19 December 2011
24	6	"The Science of Christmas"	Professor Richard Dawkins, Mark Gatiss & Roger Highfield with Helen Arney	26 December 2011

=== Series 6 (2012) ===
No. overall	No. in series	Title	Guests	Original release date
25	1	"Oceans: The Last Great Unexplored Frontier?"	Dave Gorman, Lloyd Peck & Bramley Murton	18 June 2012
26	2	"Science Mavericks"	Marcus Brigstocke, Professor Barry Marshall, Kevin Fong, & Aoife McLysaght	25 June 2012
27	3	"Does Size Matter?"	Andy Hamilton, Mark Miodownik & Eleanor Stride	2 July 2012
28	4	"The Science of Symmetry"	Marcus du Sautoy, Adam Rutherford & Alan Moore	9 July 2012
29	5	"Parallel Universes"	Professor Sir Martin Rees, Dr Lucie Green & John Lloyd	16 July 2012
30	6	"Science v Art"	Al Murray, Sara Pascoe, Andrew Pontzen & Jon Butterworth.	23 July 2012

=== Series 7 (2012) ===
No. overall	No. in series	Title	Guests	Original release date
31	1	"Space Exploration"	Sir Patrick Stewart, Ben Miller & Monica Grady	19 November 2012
32	2	"Improbable Science"	Katy Brand, Matthew Cobb & Marc Abrahams	26 November 2012
33	3	"Secret Science"	Simon Singh, Sue Black & Dave Gorman	3 December 2012
34	4	"Brain Science"	Jo Brand, Sophie Scott, & Brian Butterworth	10 December 2012
35	5	"Creating Life"	Ed Byrne, Adam Rutherford, & Philip Ball	17 December 2012
36	6	"Christmas Special: The Science of Christmas Behaviour"	Mark Gatiss, Professor Steve Jones, Richard Wiseman, Victor Stock, and Jonny & The Baptists	24 December 2012

=== Series 8 (2013) ===
No. overall	No. in series	Title	Guests	Original release date
37	1	"What is Death?"	Katy Brand, Dr Nick Lane, & Sue Black	24 June 2013
38	2	"Glastonbury"	Marcus Brigstocke, KT Tunstall, Fay Dowker, & Jeff Forshaw	1 July 2013
39	3	"Space Tourism"	Brian Blessed, Kevin Fong, and Steven Attenborough	8 July 2013
40	4	"What Makes a Science a Science"	Ben Goldacre, Sophie Scott, & Evan Davis	15 July 2013
41	5	"Alfred Russel Wallace"	Steve Jones, Aoife McLysaght, & Tony Law	22 July 2013
42	6	"Science Museum"	Neil deGrasse Tyson, Josie Long, Ian Blatchford, Richard Holmes & Doc Brown	29 July 2013

=== Series 9 (2013-14) ===
No. overall	No. in series	Title	Guests	Original release date
43	1	"Risk"	Graeme Garden, David Spiegelhalter, & Sue Ion	18 November 2013
Producer: Rami Tzabar.
44	2	"Through the Doors of Perception"	Claudia Hammond, Beau Lotto, & Alan Moore	25 November 2013
45	3	"Science Rocks!"	Hermione Cockburn, Ross Noble, & Eric Idle	2 December 2013
46	4	"To Infinity and Beyond"	John Lloyd, Colva Roney-Dougal, & Simon Singh	9 December 2013
Producer: Rami Tzabar.
47	5	"Should We Pander to Pandas?"	Sandy Knapp, Simon Watt, & Sara Pascoe	16 December 2013
48	6	"Science and Spin"	Matthew Cobb, Sheena Cruikshank, Helen Keen, & James Burke	23 December 2013
49	7	"Brian & Robin's Infinite Inbox"	None	9 March 2014

=== Series 10 (2014) ===
No. overall	No. in series	Title	Guests	Original release date
50	1	"Numbers Numbers Everywhere"	Dave Gorman, Dr Vicky Neale, & Alex Bellos	7 July 2014
51	2	"Are Humans Uniquely Unique?"	Keith Jensen, Katie Slocombe, & Ross Noble	14 July 2014
52	3	"Does Science Need War?"	Katy Brand, Philip Ball, & Kevin Fong	21 July 2014
53	4	"Can Science Save Us?"	Stephen Fry, Dr. Lucie Green, Prof. Tony Ryan & Eric Idle	28 July 2014
54	5	"Before the Big Bang"	Carlos Frenk, Fay Dowker, Ben Miller & Richard Vranch	4 August 2014
55	6	"Irrationality"	Josie Long, Paul Foot, Richard Wiseman & Stuart Ritchie	11 August 2014
56	7	"2014 Christmas Special"	Rev. Richard Coles, Chris Hadfield, Professor Francesca Stavrakopoulou, Brian Blessed	25 December 2014

=== Series 11 (2015) ===
No. overall	No. in series	Title	Guests	Original release date
57	1	"Deception"	Richard Wiseman, Sophie Scott, & David Aaronovitch	19 January 2015
58	2	"Fierce Creatures"	Steve Backshall, Lucy Cooke, & Andy Hamilton	26 January 2015
59	3	"Solar System"	Monica Grady, Jo Brand, & Carolyn Porco	2 February 2015
60	4	"When Quantum Goes Woo"	Ben Goldacre, Jeff Forshaw, & Sara Pascoe	9 February 2015
61	5	"What's The Point of Plants"	Jane Langdale, Jim Al-Khalili, & Ed Byrne	16 February 2015
62	6	"Serendipity"	Lee Mack, Simon Singh, & Andrea Sella	23 February 2015

=== Series 12 (2015) ===
No. overall	No. in series	Title	Guests	Original release date
63	1	"The Infinite Monkey Cage USA Tour: New York"	Bill Nye, Janna Levin, Tim Daly, & Lisa Lampanelli	6 July 2015
64	2	"The Infinite Monkey Cage USA Tour: Los Angeles"	Sean Carroll, Joe Rogan, David X. Cohen, & Eric Idle	13 July 2015
65	3	"The Infinite Monkey Cage USA Tour: Chicago"	Peter Sagal, Julia Sweeney, Paul Sereno, & Jerry Coyne	20 July 2015
66	4	"The Infinite Monkey Cage USA Tour: San Francisco"	Dr Seth Shostak, Dr Carolyn Porco, Greg Proops, & Paul Provenza	27 July 2015
67	5	"Speed"	Alexei Sayle, Andy Green & Professor Danielle George	3 August 2015
68	6	"Forensic Science"	Professor Sue Black, Dr Mark Spencer & Rufus Hound	10 August 2015
69	7	"2015 Christmas Special"	Ross Noble, Paul Franklin, Simon Guerrier & Victor Stock	25 December 2015

==== Year-end specials ====
To commemorate the 100th anniversary of Albert Einstein's theory of general relativity, two special episodes were added in December 2015:

No. overall	No. in series	Title	Guests	Original release date
Special	1	"Episode 1: An Infinite Monkey's Guide to General Relativity"	Ben Miller, Dara Ó Briain, Richard Vranch, & Carlos Frenk	8 December 2015
Special	2	"Episode 2: An Infinite Monkey's Guide to General Relativity"	Sean Carroll, Richard Vranch, Tim O'Brien, Sarah Bridle, & Carlos Frenk	15 December 2015

=== Series 13 (2016) ===
No. overall	No. in series	Title	Guests	Original release date
70	1	"Artificial Intelligence"	Jo Brand, Anil Seth, & Alan Winfield	11 January 2016
71	2	"What is Race?"	Shappi Khorsandi, Adam Rutherford, & Mark Thomas	18 January 2016
72	3	"Invisible Universe"	Jon Culshaw, Sarah Bridle, & Tim O'Brien	25 January 2016
73	4	"What is Reality?"	David Eagleman, Sophie Scott, & Bridget Christie	1 February 2016
74	5	"Maths of Love and Sex"	Paul Foot, Hannah Fry, & David Spiegelhalter	8 February 2016
75	6	"Climate Change"	Dara Ó Briain, Professor Tony Ryan, and Dr Gabrielle Walker	15 February 2016
76	7	"Brian & Robin's Infinite Inbox"	None	22 February 2016
Brian Cox and Robin Ince answer The Infinite Monkey Cage listeners' questions.

=== Series 14 (2016) ===
No. overall	No. in series	Title	Guests	Original release date
77	1	"The Sound of Music"	Matt Kirshen, KT Tunstall, Nitin Sawhney, Lucy Cooke, & Trevor Cox	4 July 2016
78	2	"The Recipe to Build a Universe"	Rufus Hound, Andrea Sella & Lucie Green	11 July 2016
79	3	"Science of Sleep"	Russell Foster, Richard Wiseman & Katy Brand	18 July 2016
80	4	"Battle of the Sexes"	Sophie Scott, Steve Jones & Sara Pascoe	25 July 2016
81	5	"200 Years of Frankenstein"	Noel Fielding, Nick Lane & Sir Christopher Frayling	1 August 2016
82	6	"The Universe: What Remains to Be Discovered?"	Ben Miller, Charlotte Church, Paul Abel & Tim O'Brien	8 August 2016
83	7	"2016 Christmas Special"	Neil deGrasse Tyson, Mark Gatiss, Deborah Hyde & Nick Baines	27 December 2016

=== Series 15 (2017) ===
No. overall	No. in series	Title	Guests	Original release date
84	1	"The Science of Everyday Life"	Russell Kane, Helen Czerski & Danielle George	16 January 2017
85	2	"How to Beat the House and Win at Games"	Hannah Fry, Alex Bellos, Richard Wiseman & Helen Zaltzman	23 January 2017
86	3	"Science's Epic Fails"	Rufus Hound, Professor Alice Roberts & Dr Adam Rutherford	30 January 2017
87	4	"Oceans: What Remains to Be Discovered?"	Andy Hamilton, Professor Jon Copley & Helen Scales	6 February 2017
88	5	"The Human Story: How We Got Here and Why We Survived"	Ross Noble, Professor Danielle Schreve & Chris Stringer	13 February 2017
89	6	"Making the Invisible Visible"	Katy Brand, Carlos Frenk & Matthew Cobb	20 February 2017

=== Series 16 (2017) ===
No. overall	No. in series	Title	Guests	Original release date
90	1	"What Particles Remain to be Discovered?"	Eric Idle, Jon Butterworth & Catherine Heymans	3 July 2017
91	2	"Astronaut Special"	Sandra Magnus, Terry Virts, Claude Nicollier & Charlie Duke	10 July 2017
92	3	"Oxygen: A Matter of Life or Death"	Sara Pascoe, Andrea Sella & Dr Gabrielle Walker	17 July 2017
93	4	"Will Insects Inherit the Earth?"	Dave Gorman, Tim Cockerill & Amoret Whitaker	24 July 2017
94	5	"Are We Living in a Simulation?"	Phill Jupitus, Nick Bostrom & Anil Seth	31 July 2017
95	6	"The Mind v the Brain?"	Katy Brand, Uta Frith & Sophie Scott	7 August 2017
96	7	"2017 Christmas Special: The Science of Magic"	Andy Nyman, Diane Morgan, Richard Wiseman & Francesca Stavrakopoulou	25 December 2017

=== Series 17 (2018) ===
No. overall	No. in series	Title	Guests	Original release date
97	1	"When Two Stars Collide"	Dara Ó Briain, Sheila Brown & Nils Andersson	8 January 2018
98	2	"The Secret Life of Birds"	Katy Brand, Steve Backshall, Professor Tim Birkhead & special guest Brann the Raven	15 January 2018
99	3	"Antibiotics"	Chris Addison, Chief Medical Officer, Dame Sally Davies & Martha Clokie	22 January 2018
100	4	"Teenage Brain"	Rory Bremner, Professor Sarah-Jayne Blakemore & Professor Matthew Cobb	29 January 2018
101	5	"How Animals Behave"	Rufus Hound, Lucy Cooke & Professor Rory Wilson	5 February 2018
102	6	"Volcanoes"	Jo Brand, Tamsin Mather & Clive Oppenheimer	12 February 2018

=== Series 18 (2018) ===
No. overall	No. in series	Title	Guests	Original release date
103	TV–Special	"Infinite Monkey Cage 100"	Katy Brand, Brian Blessed, Eric Idle, Dave Gorman, Andy Hamilton, Alice Roberts, Neil DeGrasse Tyson, Sue Black, Fay Dowker, David Spiegelhalter, Richard Wiseman, Professor Tony Ryan & Andrea Sella	11 July 2018
104	1	"Big Data"	Danny Wallace, Hannah Fry & Timandra Harkness	16 July 2018
105	2	"Invasion!"	Phill Jupitus, Kate Jones & Mark Spencer	23 July 2018
106	3	"Immune System"	Shappi Khorsandi, Professor Dan Davis & Professor Steve Jones	30 July 2018
107	4	"The Human Voice"	Beardyman, Professor Trevor Cox & Professor Sophie Scott	6 August 2018
108	5	"GCHQ"	Katy Brand	13 August 2018

=== Series 19 (2019) ===
No. overall	No. in series	Title	Guests	Original release date
109	1	"Microbes: Secret Rulers of the World?"	Jon Copley, Monica Grady & Ed Byrne	7 January 2019
110	2	"The Future of Humanity"	Chris Addison, Astronomer Royal Lord Martin Rees & Baroness Cathy Ashton	14 January 2019
111	3	"The Origin of Numbers"	Matt Parker, Dr Hannah Fry & Professor Brian Butterworth	21 January 2019
112	4	"Are Humans Still Evolving?"	David Baddiel, Professor Aoife McLysaght & Dr Adam Rutherford	28 January 2019
113	5	"How to Build a Bionic Human"	Dr Kevin Fong, Noel Fitzpatrick & Lucy Beaumont	4 February 2019
114	6	"How to Measure the Universe"	Jo Brand, Professor Jo Dunkley & Dr Adam Masters	11 February 2019

==== Moon landing anniversary special (2019) ====
To commemorate the 50th anniversary of the Apollo 11 Moon landing, a special episode was added in July 2019:

No. overall	No. in series	Title	Guests	Original release date
Special	1	"The Infinite Moonkey Cage"	Rusty Schweickart, Gerry Griffin, Andy Aldrin, and Jan Aldrin	19 July 2019

=== Series 20 (2019) ===
No. overall	No. in series	Title	Guests	Original release date
115	1	"Dinosaurs"	Susannah Maidment, Steve Brusatte & Rufus Hound	16 September 2019
116	2	"Clever Creatures"	Tim Birkhead, Helen Scales & Danny Wallace	23 September 2019
117	3	"Science of Dreaming"	Professor Penny Lewis, Professor Richard Wiseman & Bridget Christie	30 September 2019
118	4	"Anniversary of the Periodic Table"	Professor Polly Arnold, Professor Andrea Sella & Katy Brand	7 October 2019
119	5	"Brits in Space"	Tim Peake, Helen Sharman & Mark Steel	14 October 2019

=== Series Twenty-one ===
No. overall	No. in series	Title	Guests	Original release date
120	1	"The Science of Laughter"	Professor Sophie Scott, Professor Richard Wiseman & Frank Skinner	13 January 2020
121	2	"Conspiracy Theories"	Professor Karen Douglas, Dr David Robert Grimes & Shazia Mirza	20 January 2020
122	3	"Coral Reefs"	Dr Heather Koldewey, Professor Callum Roberts & Marcus Brigstocke	27 January 2020
123	4	"Fire"	Niamh Nic Daéid, Adam Rutherford & Ed Byrne	3 February 2020
124	5	"Quantum Worlds"	Jim Al-Khalili, Sean Carroll & Katy Brand	10 February 2020
125	6	"UFO Special"	Maggie Aderin-Pocock, Dallas Campbell, Professor Tim O'Brien & Lucy Beaumont	17 February 2020

=== Series Twenty-two ===
No. overall	No. in series	Title	Guests	Original release date
126	1	"The End of the Universe"	Brian Greene, Katie Mack, Eric Idle & Steve Martin	25 May 2020
127	2	"Black Holes"	Sean Carroll, Janna Levin & Matt Lucas	1 June 2020
128	3	"Space Archaeology"	Alice Roberts, Sarah Parcak & Sara Pascoe	8 June 2020
129	4	"An Astronaut's Guide To Isolation"	Chris Hadfield, Rusty Schweickart, Helen Sharman & Nicole Stott	15 June 2020
130	5	"The Sun"	Lucie Green, Steve Jones & Tim Minchin	22 June 2020
131	6	"When the Monkeys met the Chimps"	Dr Jane Goodall, Dr Cat Hobaiter & Bill Bailey	29 June 2020
132	7	"Does Time Exist?"	Fay Dowker, Carlo Rovelli & Mark Gatiss	6 July 2020
133	8	"The Human Brain"	David Eagleman, Gina Rippon & Conan O'Brien	14 July 2020
134	9	"What is Life?"	Prof Aoife McLysaght, Sir Paul Nurse, Jo Brand & Ross Noble	20 July 2020

=== Series Twenty-three ===
No. overall	No. in series	Title	Guests	Original release date
135	1	"In Praise of Flies"	Matthew Cobb, Erica McAlister & David Baddiel	11 January 2021
136	2	"Under our Night Sky"	Tim Peake, Jon Culshaw, Lisa Harvey-Smith & Stuart Clark	18 January 2021
137	3	"Neanderthals"	Alan Davies, Rebecca Wragg Sykes & Tori Herridge	25 January 2021
138	4	"The Science of Cooking"	Katy Brand, Grace Dent, Harold McGee & Mark Miodownik	1 February 2021
139	5	"The Fundamentals of Reality"	Janna Levin, Frank Wilczek, Eric Idle & Sara Pascoe	8 February 2021
140	6	"A History of Rock"	Chris Jackson, Susie Maidment & Ross Noble	15 February 2021

=== Series Twenty-four ===
No. overall	No. in series	Title	Guests	Original release date
141	1	"Bats v Flies"	Kate Jones, Erica McAlister & Dave Gorman	25 June 2022
142	2	"Exploring the Deep"	Diva Amon, Jon Copley & Tim Minchin	2 July 2022
143	3	"The Wood Wide Web"	Suzanne Simard, Mark Spencer & Brendan Hunt	9 July 2022
144	4	"Black Holes"	Netta Engelhardt, Janna Levin & Eric Idle	16 July 2022
145	5	"Astronauts"	Chris Hadfield, Carolyn Porco, Nicole Stott & Katy Brand	23 July 2022
146	6	"Brains"	Uta Frith, Sophie Scott & Alan Davies	30 July 2022
147	7	"How to Teach Maths"	Hannah Fry, Matt Parker, David Spiegelhalter & Sara Pascoe	6 August 2022

=== Series Twenty-five ===
No. overall	No. in series	Title	Guests	Original release date
148	1	"What have we learnt from Covid?"	Dame Sarah Gilbert, Professor Dan Davis & Dr Chris Van Tulleken	12 November 2022
149	2	"Exploring our solar system"	Conan O'Brien, Dr Katie Stack Morgan & Dr Kevin Hand	19 November 2022
150	3	"Hunting for Exoplanets"	Eric Idle, Jessie Christiansen, Tiffany Kataria & Sean Carroll	26 November 2022
151	4	"Can we cure aging?"	Sarah Kendall, Dame Linda Partridge & Dr Andrew Steele	3 December 2022
152	5	"The Age of Conspiracy"	David Baddiel, Professor Karen Douglas, Professor Matthew Cobb & Dr Timotheus Vermeulen	10 December 2022
153	6	"The Deep Space Network"	Mark Cheung, Alan Duffy, Brian Schmidt & Alice Fraser	17 December 2022
154	7	"Why does wine taste good?"	Tim Minchin, Brian Schmidt, Mango Parker and Patricia Williamson	24 December 2022

=== Series Twenty-six ===
No. overall	No. in series	Title	Guests	Original release date
155	1	"Southern Skies"	Kirsten Banks, Devika Kamath & Ross Noble	18 February 2023
156	2	"Australia's Scary Spiders"	Dieter Hochuli, Mariella Herberstein & Claire Hooper	25 February 2023
157	3	"How to think like a mathematician"	Jo Brand, Professor Hannah Fry, Dr Eugenia Cheng & Randall Munroe	4 March 2023
158	4	"How to commit the perfect murder"	Susan Calman, Professor Sue Black & Dr Julia Shaw	11 March 2023
159	5	"How Far Can the Human Body Go?"	Polly McGuigan, Ben Garrod, Russell Kane & Sally Gunnell	18 March 2023
160	6	"Magic Materials"	Mark Miodownik, Anna Ploszajski & Ed Byrne	25 March 2023

=== Series Twenty-seven ===
No. overall	No. in series	Title	Guests	Original release date
161	1	"Are we what we eat?"	Dr Chris van Tulleken, Professor Janet Cade & Harry Hill	24 June 2023
162	2	"Supervolcanoes"	Tamsin Mather, Chris Jackson & Rachel Parris	3 July 2023
163	3	"Bees v Wasps"	Dave Goulson, Seirian Sumner & Catherine Bohart	8 July 2023
164	4	"The Magic of Mushrooms "	Phil Wang, Merlin Sheldrake & Katie Field	15 July 2023
165	5	"The Secret Life of Sharks"	Lucy Hawkes, Isla Hodgson & Steve Backshall	22 July 2023
166	6	"Ancient DNA Secrets"	Ben Willbond, Turi King, Tom Booth & Sir Paul Nurse	29 July 2023
167	7	"Cosmic Dust"	Matthew Genge, Penny Wozniakiewicz & Alan Davies	5 August 2023

=== Series Twenty-eight ===
No. overall	No. in series	Title	Guests	Original release date
168	1	"Octopuses!"	Dr Tim Lamont, Amy Courtney & Russell Kane	11 November 2023
169	2	"The Science of Coincidence"	Sophie Duker, Marcus Du Sautoy & David Spiegelhalter	18 November 2023
170	3	"How I is AI?"	Rufus Hound, Hannah Fry & Kate Devlin	25 November 2023
171	4	"The Scale of Life (or were dinosaurs just too big?)"	Dave Gorman, Susie Maidment & Tori Herridge	2 December 2023
172	5	"Hollywood in Space"	Paul Franklin, Tim Peake, Nicole Stott & Susan Kilrain	9 December 2023
173	6	"Jo Brand's Quantum World"	Jo Brand, Professor Ben Allanach & Professor Fay Dowker	16 December 2023
174	7	"The Monkeys meet The Sky at Night"	Dara Ó Briain, Dr Maggie Aderin Pocock, Chris Lintott & Pete Lawrence	23 December 2023

=== Series Twenty-nine ===
No. overall	No. in series	Title	Guests	Original release date
175	1	"Egyptian Mummies"	Russell Kane, Lucy Porter, Rosalie David & Lidija McKnight	17 February 2024
176	2	"Could it be magic?"	Alan Davies, Richard Wiseman, Laura London and Gustav Kuhn	24 February 2024
177	3	"Asteroids"	John Bishop, Sara Russell & Alan Fitzsimmons	2 March 2024
178	4	"Poison"	Hugh Dennis, Andrea Sella & Kathryn Harkup	9 March 2024
179	5	"Cats v Dogs"	Deborah Meaden, David Baddiel, Ben Garrod & Jess French	16 March 2024
180	6	"Higgs Boson"	Katy Brand, Ben Miller, Tevong You and Clara Nellist	23 March 2024

=== Series Thirty ===
No. overall	No. in series	Title	Guests	Original release date
181	1	"The Wonder of Trees"	Judi Dench, Tony Kirkham & Tristan Gooley	11 July 2024
182	2	"Science of Board Games"	Jess Fostekew, Marcus du Sautoy & Dave Neale	18 July 2024
183	3	"'Beastly Bodies' Kids Special"	Steve Backshall, Jess French & Adam Kay	25 July 2024
184	4	"Extreme Exploration"	Anneka Rice, Mike Massimino, Britney Schmidt & Jess Phoenix	1 August 2024
185	5	"What a Gas!"	Dave Gorman, Mark Miodownik & Lucy Carpenter	8 August 2024
186	6	"An Unexpected History of Science"	Rufus Hound, Matthew Cobb, Victoria Herridge & Keith Moore	15 August 2024
187	7	"Alien Life"	Russell Kane, Lisa Kaltenegger & Chris Lintott	22 August 2024

=== Series Thirty One ===
No. overall	No. in series	Title	Guests	Original release date
188	1	"The Cyber Codebreakers"	Alan Davies, Victoria Baines and Richard Benham	13 November 2024
189	2	"Hedgehogs"	Hugh Warwick, Sophie Lund Rasmussen & Pam Ayres	20 November 2024
190	3	"Starless World"	John Bishop, Maggie Aderin-Pocock & Roberto Trotta	27 November 2024
191	4	"Science of Baby Making"	Professor Joyce Harper, Ben Steventon & Sara Pascoe	4 December 2024
192	5	"Fantastic Elastic"	Bryony Page, Jessica Fostekew, Anna Ploszajski & James Busfield	11 December 2024
193	6	"Is Extinction the End?"	Adam Rutherford, Susannah Maidment & Ria Lina	18 December 2024
194	7	"An Unexpected History of the Body"	Sir Mark Walport, Professor Helen King, Ed Byrne & Keith Moore	25 December 2024

=== Series Thirty Two ===
No. overall	No. in series	Title	Guests	Original release date
195	1	"Journey to the Centre of the Earth"	Phil Wang, Ana Ferreira & Chris Jackson	19 February 2025
196	2	"How selfish are we really?"	Jo Brand, Patti Wilks & Steve Jones	26 February 2025
197	3	"Adventures on Ice"	Darren Harriott, Liz Morris, Christoph Salzmann & Felicity Aston	5 March 2025
198	4	"Saturn v Jupiter"	Katherine Parkinson, Paul Abel & Michele Dougherty	12 March 2025
199	5	"The Sound of Music"	Brian Eno, Sam Bennett & Trevor Cox	19 March 2025
200	6	"Nature's Shapes"	Dave Gorman, Sarah Hart & Thomas Woolley	26 March 2025

=== Series Thirty Three ===
No. overall	No. in series	Title	Guests	Original release date
201	1	"201st Birthday Bonanza"	Mel Giedroyc, Deborah Meaden & Nish Kumar	10 July 2025
202	2	"Should We Settle in Space?"	Tim Peake, Kelly Weinersmith & Alan Davies	17 July 2025
203	3	"How to Build the Perfect Athlete"	Helen Glover, Hugh Dennis, Steve Haake & Emma Ross	24 July 2025
204	4	"The Mighty Spud"	Sandy Knapp, Glenn Bryan & Susan Calman	31 July 2025
205	5	"Technofossils"	Sarah Gabbott, Mark Miodownik & Aurie Styla	7 August 2025
206	6	"Moths v Butterflies"	Katy Brand, Jane Hill and Chris Jiggins	14 August 2025
207	7	"Illuminating Light"	Jess Wade, Russell Foster & Bridget Christie	21 August 2025

=== Series Thirty Four ===
No. overall	No. in series	Title	Guests	Original release date
208	1	"Mind-reading Computers"	Phil Wang, Anne Vanhoestenberghe & Luke Bashford	13 November 2025
209	2	"What's The Time"	Marcus Brigstocke, Leon Lobo & Louise Devoy	20 November 2025
210	3	"What’s the deal with eels?"	Lucy Porter, David Righton & Caroline Durif	27 November 2025
211	4	"Fusion"	Ria Lina, Yasmin Andrew & Howard Wilson	4 December 2025
212	5	"Head in the Clouds"	Owain Wyn Evans, Gavin Pretor-Pinney & Amanda Maycock	11 December 2025
213	6	"Monkey Business"	Robin Dunbar, Dave Gorman & Jo Setchell	18 December 2025
214	7	"The North Pole Unwrapped (Christmas Special)"	Russell Kane, Felicity Aston & Lloyd Peck	25 December 2025

=== Series Thirty Five ===
No. overall	No. in series	Title	Guests	Original release date
215	1	"The First Britons"	Tim Minchin, Prof Chris Stringer & Dr Selina Brace	15 October 2026
215	2	"Nothing Really Matters"	Hugh Dennis, Ria Lina, Harry Cliff & Yvette Fuentes	22 October 2026
215	3	"Ghosts"	Isy Suttie, Laurence Rickard, Ciarán O'Keeffe & Chris French	29 October 2026
216	4	"Leaf it to Nature"	Tracy Lawson, Jonathan Silvertown & Alex Kealy	5 November 2026
217	5	"Guano: Liquid Gold"	TBA	TBA

== Humour ==
The programme features a number of running themes and gags. Robin Ince regularly pokes fun at Brian Cox's hair, good looks and former career as a rock musician. Ince often imitates and quotes Carl Sagan. Cox often ridicules chemistry, astrology and Creationists and occasionally returns to the subject of how and when a strawberry can be considered dead.

== Theme song ==
The programme's theme song was written by Eric Idle and recorded by Idle and Jeff Lynne. Idle and his band performed the song live on the show when it toured in Los Angeles in 2015 and it appears in the 2016 TV show "The Entire Universe".

== Live show ==
Ince and Cox headed an Uncaged Monkeys live tour in 2011, and toured the United States in 2015.

== Book ==
In April 2018 a book titled Infinite Monkey Cage – How to Build a Universe was released. Its audiobook was read by Cox and Ince.
