= Bluedot Festival =

Music and science festival in Cheshire, England

Bluedot
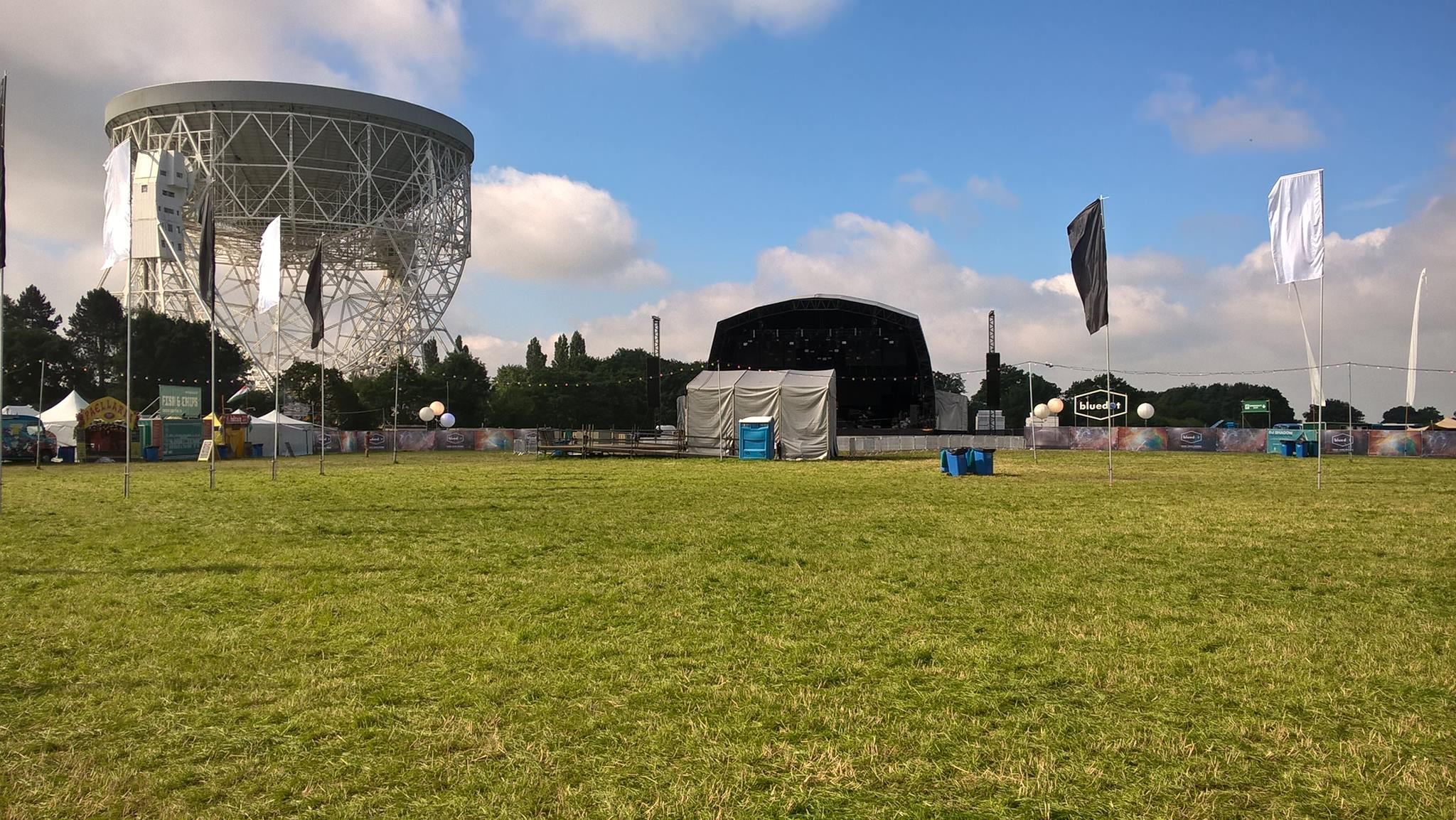
- Setting up the 2016 festival. Bluedot takes place against the backdrop of the Lovell Telescope at Jodrell Bank Observatory (JBO) in Cheshire.
- Status: Defunct
- Genre: Music festival, Science festival
- Frequency: Annual
- Locations: Jodrell Bank Observatory, Cheshire, United Kingdom
- Inaugurated: 22 July 2016
- Most recent: 21 July 2023
- Attendance: 15,000 per day
- Website: discoverthebluedot.com

Bluedot was a music, science and culture event held annually in July from 2016 to 2023 at Jodrell Bank Observatory in Cheshire, England, combining music, live science experiments, expert talks and immersive artworks.

The event is endorsed by the University of Manchester, current owners of the observatory.

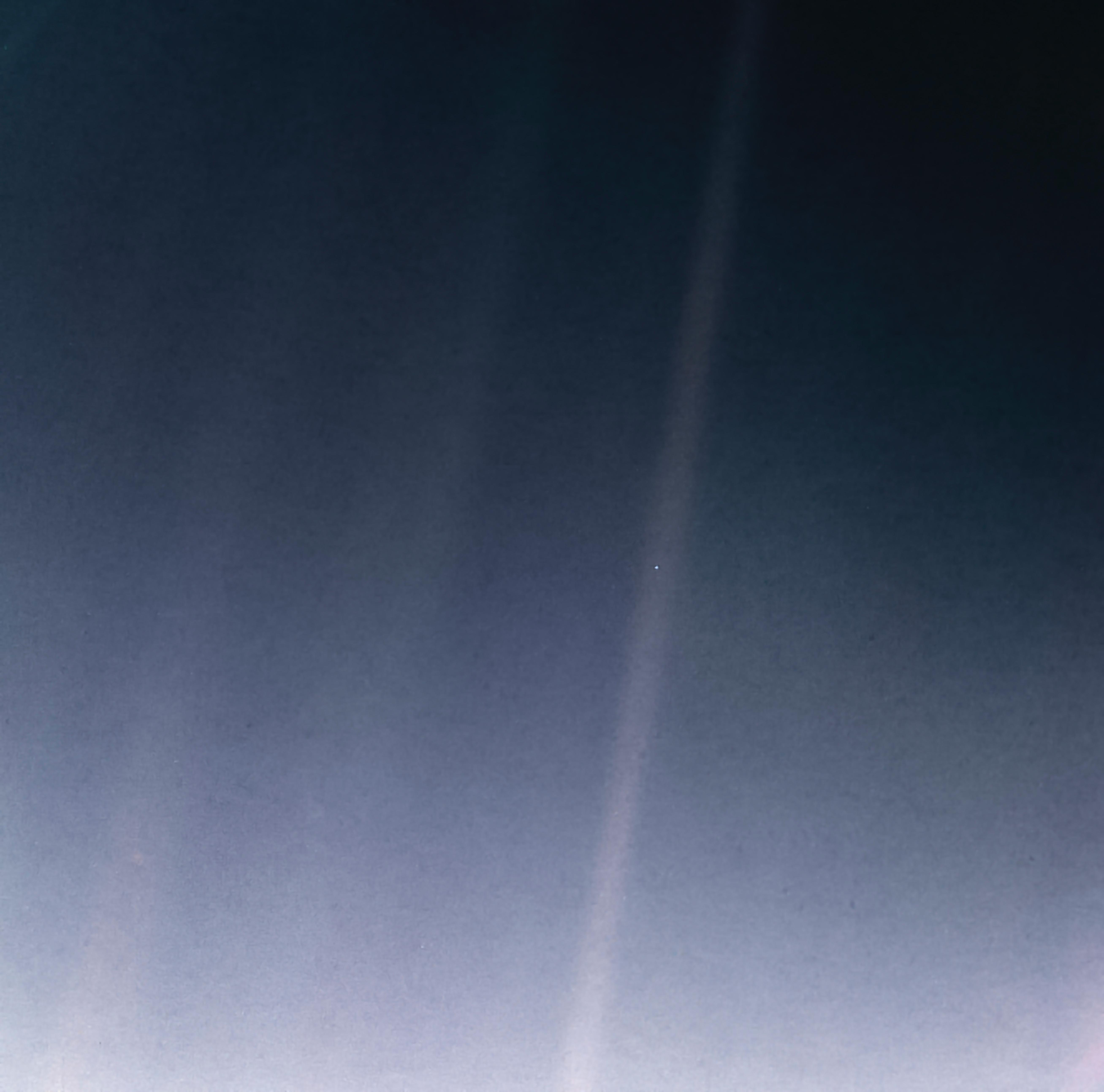
The 1990 Pale Blue Dot photograph

The festival is named after Pale Blue Dot, a famous 1990 photograph of planet Earth popularised by Carl Sagan.

In May 2022, it was announced the live entertainment platform, Superstruct Entertainment has acquired a majority stake in Bluedot.

After heavy rainfall affected the festival in 2023, organiser announced that the event would have a fallow year in 2024 to allow "a period of rest during which the soil will recover and regenerate". The festival has yet to return.

== Musical performances ==
Since 2016, acts performing at the bluedot festival have included Orbital, Underworld, Alt-J, Goldfrapp, Jean-Michel Jarre, The Chemical Brothers, Gary Numan and The Flaming Lips.

Kraftwerk headlined Saturday at the 2019 event, alongside New Order and Hot Chip.

The 2020 festival was due to feature Björk, Groove Armada and Metronomy, however the event was cancelled due to the COVID-19 pandemic. The acts were rescheduled to headline the festival in July 2021. However, the festival was cancelled for a second time due to COVID-19, citing the lack of insurance from the British government to cover financial losses if the event were to be cancelled for COVID-19-related reasons. Bluedot returned in July 2022, with Björk headlining.

Taking place in 2023, the final festival was headlined by Grace Jones.

== Science talks ==
The festival has included talks and demonstrations from

- Jim Al-Khalili
- Teresa Anderson
- Sarah Bridle
- Philippa Browning
- Richard Dawkins
- Brian Cox
- Tamsin Edwards
- Tim O'Brien
- Lisa Harvey-Smith
- Jess Wade
- Heather Williams
