= Christopher Jackson (geologist) =

British academic & geologist (born 1977)

Professor Christopher Jackson
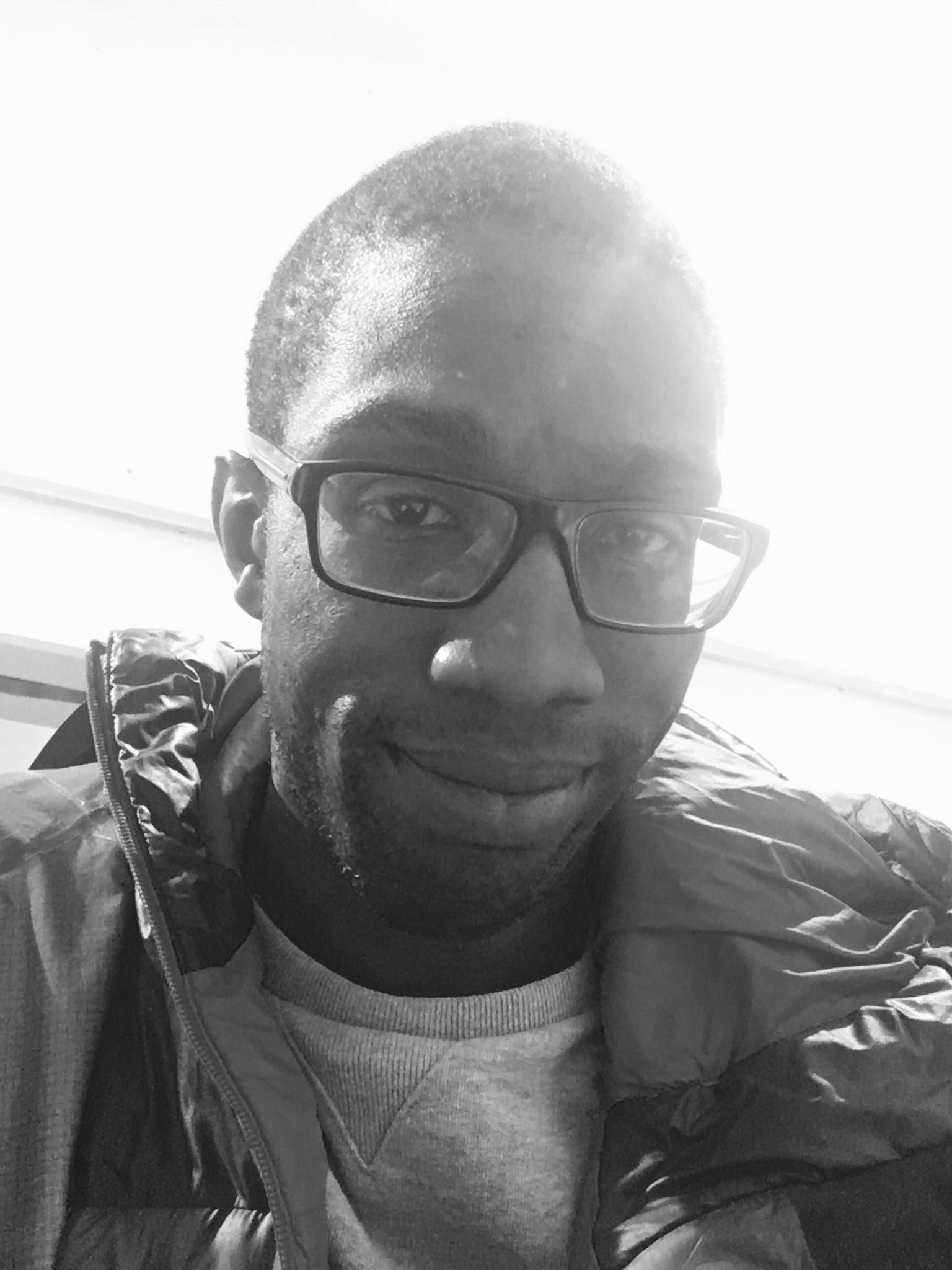
- Born: 1977 (age 48–49)
- Education: University of Manchester, BSc (1998); University of Manchester, PhD (2002)
- Scientific career
- Workplaces: Norsk Hydro; Imperial College London; University of Manchester
- Thesis: Structural and stratigraphic evolution of rift basins : the Hammam Faraun area, Suez rift, Egypt (2002)

Christopher Aiden-Lee Jackson (born 1977) is a British geoscientist and science communicator. He was previously Professor of Sustainable Geoscience at the University of Manchester, and before that held the Equinor Chair of Basin Analysis at Imperial College, London. He is known for his work in geoscience, especially in the use of 3D seismic data to understand dynamic processes in sedimentary basins.

== Education ==
Christopher Jackson was born in Derby in the East Midlands. He attended Wilmorton Primary School and Noel Baker Community school. Jackson completed a BSc in Geology at the University of Manchester in 1998. He stayed on at the University of Manchester to undertake a PhD in the tectono-stratigraphic evolution of sedimentary basins with Rob Gawthorpe, completing in 2002.

== Research and career ==
Jackson's research focuses on the geodynamic, structural, and stratigraphic evolution of sedimentary basins. He has been described by the Geological Society of London as the "leading and most productive interpreter of three-dimensional seismic reflection data of his generation." After completing his PhD in 2002, he was an exploration research geologist in the Norsk Hydro research center, Bergen.

In 2004, Jackson joined Imperial College London as a lecturer in Basin Analysis in the Department of Earth Science and Engineering, where he was appointed Statoil Professor of Basin Analysis in 2015. In 2014, he joined the Applied Geodynamics Laboratory at the University of Texas at Austin as a visiting scientist. Between 2015 and 2016 he was a Visiting Lecturer in Petroleum Science at the University of Namibia. He was promoted to Equinor Professor of Basin Analysis at Imperial College in 2018. In 2019, he was the H. Burr Steinbach Visiting Scholar at the Woods Hole Oceanographic Institute. Part of the open access movement within academia, Jackson founded EarthArxiv, a free preprint service for the earth sciences.

In a 2017 interview with the Guardian newspaper, Jackson stated that he knew of "no other black, full-time, Earth science academic in the UK – or in fact, Europe or the US." Jackson is on the editorial board of the Journal of Petroleum Geology. He is a Fellow of the Geological Society of London. Jackson delivered the closing of the 2015 Geological Society of London lecture series, "Terra Infirma: What has salt tectonics ever done for us?"

In 2020 he was appointed to the Chair in Sustainable Geoscience at the University of Manchester, taking up the post in early 2021. In March 2022, Jackson announced on Twitter that he was leaving the University of Manchester to work for the scientific consulting firm Jacobs Engineering Group. According to an interview with Nature, Jackson "received what was, in his opinion, a racially insensitive e-mail that constituted harassment and alluded to using social media to police staff opinions, which, he says, was the last straw". He filed a formal complaint with the university.

== Broadcasting ==
Jackson is a popular science communicator and has delivered scientific talks at several major festivals.

=== Television ===
In 2017 Jackson joined a team of scientists and adventurers, including Xand Van Tulleken, to take part in an expedition to volcanoes. The two-part BBC documentary Expedition Volcano involved the scientists studying Nyiragongo and Nyamulagira, two of the world's most dangerous volcanoes in the Congo.

In 2020 Jackson jointly presented the 2020 Royal Institution Christmas Lectures on British television, thus becoming the first black scientist to do so. After it was announced that he was to be one of the lecturers, Jackson was the subject of racist abuse online, including being sent a clip on Twitter of a black person being beaten. He also received letters telling him to "go live in the Caribbean" and stating "blacks like you are a total disgrace". Jackson reported the abuse to the police.

Additionally, Jackson has appeared on The Great British Menu, a series of earth science documentaries for Nova, and the third season of Prehistoric Planet.

=== Radio and podcasts ===
He has appeared on the BBC Radio 4 programmes The Life Scientific and The Infinite Monkey Cage, as well as The Graham Norton Show He has presented his own podcast, A Grown Up Guide to Planet Earth, which was hosted on Audible.

== Awards ==
- 2021: Geological Society of London Coke Medal
- 2021: American Association of Petroleum Geologists Geoscience in the Media Award
- 2021: Geological Society of America Honorary Fellow
- 2020: University of Manchester - Chair in Sustainable Geoscience
- 2020: Imperial College - President's Award for Excellence in Societal Engagement
- 2019: Journal of Sedimentary Research - Outstanding Paper Award
- 2019: Geological Society of America - GEOLOGY Journal, Exceptional Reviewer
- 2018: American Association of Petroleum Geologists - Carlos Walter M. Campos Memorial Award (Best Student Paper)
- 2016: Geological Society of America - Thompson Distinguished Lecturer Award
- 2015: American Association of Petroleum Geologists - Wallace E. Pratt Memorial Award for Best Original Article
- 2014: Visiting Research Scientist - Applied Geodynamics Laboratory (AGL), Bureau of Economic Geology (BEG), University of Texas at Austin
- 2013–2016: Chair - British Sedimentological Research Group
- 2013: Geological Society of London - Bigsby Medal
- 2012–2013: Bureau of Economic Geology (BEG), University of Texas at Austin - Research Fellowship
- 2012–2013: American Association of Petroleum Geologists - Distinguished Lecturer
- 2012–2015: American Association of Petroleum Geologists - Senior Associate Editor
- 2012–2015: Basin Research - Editor
- 2011: British Sedimentological Research Group - Roland Goldring Award
