= Matthew Cobb =

British Professor of Zoology at the University of Manchester

- Born: Matthew John Cobb; 4 February 1957 (age 69)
- Education: University of Sheffield (BA, PhD)
- Awards: JBS Haldane Lecture (2021); Wilkins-Bernal-Medawar Medal and Lecture (2024)
- Scientific career
- Fields: Zoology
- Workplaces: University of Manchester; French National Centre for Scientific Research; Sorbonne Paris North University
- Thesis: Courtship behaviour in the melanogaster species sub-group of the Drosophila (1983)
- Website: research.manchester.ac.uk/en/persons/cobb

Matthew John Cobb (born 4 February 1957) is a British zoologist and Emeritus professor of zoology at the University of Manchester. He is known for his popular science books The Egg & Sperm Race: The Seventeenth-Century Scientists Who Unravelled the Secrets of Sex, Life and Growth; Life's Greatest Secret: The Race to Crack the Genetic Code; and The Idea of the Brain: A History. Cobb has appeared on BBC Radio 4's The Infinite Monkey Cage, The Life Scientific, Start the Week and The Curious Cases of Rutherford & Fry, as well as on BBC Radio 3 and the BBC World Service.

== Education ==
Cobb earned his Bachelor of Arts degree in Psychology at the University of Sheffield. During the second year of his undergraduate studies he read an article about the recent discovery of the Drosophila melanogaster dunce mutant in New Scientist and decided to focus on behavioural genetics in fruit flies, later saying he, "went on to do my PhD there, in Psychology and Genetics, looking at the mating behaviour of seven species of fruitfly. Psychology in those days was as much about animal behaviour as it was about human psychology, and I was lucky enough to be in one of the few places in the UK that studied [it]". He completed his PhD in 1983.

== Career and research ==
From 1981 to 1984, Cobb conducted twin studies at the Institute of Psychiatry in London, research he later described as trying "to get human twins drunk". He has said, "This was interesting, but convinced me that I did not want to do research on human beings". In 1984, he obtained funding through the Royal Society's Science Exchange Programme to work with Jean-Marc Jallon in Gif-sur-Yvette, France, where he was introduced to the use of pheromones and smell by animals as a means of communication. Once his Royal Society grant finished, Cobb spent a year and a half working at the Université Sorbonne Paris Nord in Villetaneuse, where he lectured in psychophysiology. In 1998, Cobb joined the French National Centre for Scientific Research (CNRS), working first at its Orsay facility, utilising Drosophila maggots to study the sense of smell, and from 1995 at its Laboratoire d'Ecologie in Paris where he investigated olfactory communication in ants.

Since 2002, Cobb has worked at the University of Manchester, initially as a lecturer in animal behaviour and later as professor of zoology.

=== Communicating science ===
Cobb has become known to a wider audience through his books for the general public. In 2007, his book The Egg and Sperm Race: The Seventeenth-Century Scientists Who Unravelled the Secrets of Sex, Life and Growth won the Thomson Reuters/Zoological Record Award for Communicating Zoology.

Life's Greatest Secret: The Story of the Race to Crack the Genetic Code, was shortlisted in 2015 for the £25,000 Royal Society Winton Prize.

In 2020, Cobb's book The Idea of the Brain was the only science work to be shortlisted for the £50,000 Baillie Gifford Prize for Non-Fiction. It was also chosen as one of The Sunday Times' Books of the Year and The Daily Telegraph listed it as one of its "50 best books of 2020".

Cobb has made many appearances on radio, including appearances on the BBC science programmes The Curious Cases of Rutherford & Fry, Inside Science, and The Infinite Monkey Cage. In March 2020, he was the subject of the BBC Radio 4 programme The Life Scientific.

Cobb has written and provided expert comments for publications including New Scientist and The Guardian, translated five books from French into English, and written two books on the history of France during World War II.

=== Awards and honours ===
In December 2020, The Genetics Society said that it was "delighted to announce Professor Matthew Cobb as the winner of the 2021 JBS Haldane Lecture" adding that he is expected to present his lecture at the Royal Institution, in November 2021.

In 2024 Cobb was awarded The Wilkins-Bernal-Medawar Medal and Lecture by the Royal Society for his work documenting the history of biology as both an author and a broadcaster.

=== Publications ===
Cobb's publications include:

- 60 years ago, Francis Crick changed the logic of biology
- Drosophila cuticular hydrocarbons revisited: mating status alters cuticular profiles
- The Genetic Age: Our Perilous Quest To Edit Life
- Smell: A Very Short Introduction
- The Idea of the Brain: A History
- Life's Greatest Secret: The Race to Crack the Genetic Code
- Eleven Days in August: The Liberation of Paris in 1944
- The Resistance: The French Fight Against the Nazis
- The Egg and Sperm Race: The Seventeenth-Century Scientists Who Unravelled the Secrets of Sex, Life and Growth
- Generation
- The Black Box of Biology: A History of the Molecular Revolution
- Insect Taste: Vol 63
