= Tony Ryan (scientist) =

British polymer chemist

Tony Ryan OBE FRSC
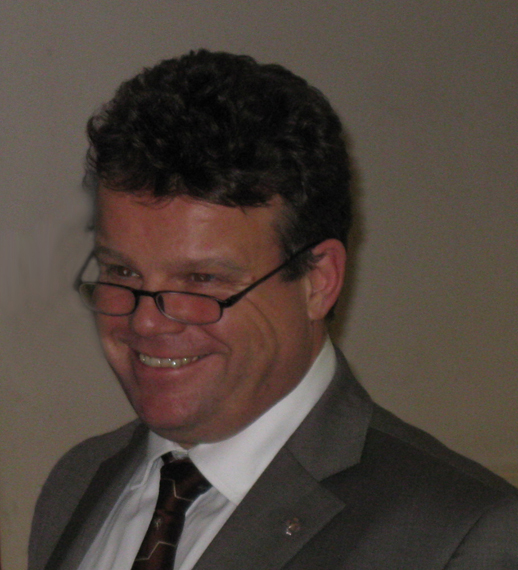
- Born: Anthony John Ryan; 1962 (age 63–64); Leeds, England
- Education: University of Manchester
- Awards: Royal Institution Christmas Lectures (2002)
- Scientific career
- Fields: polymers; crystallisation; block copolymers
- Workplaces: University of Sheffield; University of Manchester Institute of Science and Technology; University of Minnesota
- Thesis: Structure property relations in poly(urethane-urea)s and polyureas formed by reaction injection moulding, RIM (1988)
- Doctoral advisor: R. H. Still
- Website: www.sheffield.ac.uk/chemistry/staff/profiles/anthony_ryan

Anthony John Ryan (born 1962) is an English polymer chemist and sustainability leader at the University of Sheffield. He was Pro-Vice-Chancellor of the university's Faculty of Science from 2008 until 2016, and is currently Director of the Grantham Centre for Sustainable Futures. He delivered the 2002 Royal Institution Christmas Lectures and has appeared on programmes including the BBC Radio 4 comedy and popular science series The Infinite Monkey Cage. He has collaborated on a range of arts and sciences projects with Professor Helen Storey from the London College of Fashion, University of the Arts London.

== Education ==
Ryan graduated with a Bachelor of Science degree in Polymer Science and Technology from the University of Manchester Institute of Science and Technology (UMIST) in 1983, and a PhD from the same institution in 1988 for research supervised by R. H. Still. He received a Doctor of Science (DSc) from UMIST in 2004.

== Career and research ==
Ryan's career began as a lecturer in Polymer Science at UMIST (1985–1988), followed by a NATO Research Fellow position at the University of Minnesota (1988–1989), before returning to UMIST as a lecturer in 1990. He was promoted to senior lecturer in 1994 and reader in 1995. In 1997 he joined the University of Sheffield's Department of Chemistry as a Professor of Physical Chemistry, becoming Head of Department from 1999 until 2004. He also served as Director of the university's Polymer Centre from 2000 until 2008, when he became Pro-Vice-Chancellor of the Faculty of Science, a post he held until 2016. Ryan has been a visiting professor at the London College of Fashion, University of The Arts since 2009 and an Honorary Professor at Nanjing Tech University since 2014. In the 2006 New Year Honours, he was appointed Order of the British Empire (OBE) for services to Science.

Ryan's chemistry research is based around phase transitions in polymers. He cites his main contribution to the field of polymer chemistry as the development and application of the techniques of time-resolved structural tools to polymers. This work won prizes in 1990 from the Plastics and Rubber Institute, in 1992, 1999 and 2003 from the Royal Society of Chemistry and in 1999 from the Polymer Processing Society. Ryan was elected a fellow of the Royal Society of Chemistry (FRSC).

As leader of the University of Sheffield's programme of sustainability research and Director of the Grantham Centre for Sustainable Futures, Ryan's focus is on "the global challenge of the food, water and energy nexus, feeding a growing world population, reducing the impacts of agriculture and food production that account for 25-30% of greenhouse gas emissions, and harnessing the power of the sun for food production and renewable energy".

=== Project Sunshine and the Grantham Centre for Sustainable Futures ===
Upon becoming Pro-Vice-Chancellor at the University of Sheffield, Ryan spearheaded Project Sunshine, which brought together a number of areas of scientific research under the umbrella of sustainability. The project's stated aim was to "harness the power of the sun to tackle the biggest challenge facing the world today: meeting the increasing food and energy needs of the world’s population in the context of an uncertain climate and global environment change". Project Sunshine expanded into areas of engineering and social sciences and two cohorts of interdisciplinary PhD students were recruited to a Project Sunshine Centre for Doctoral Training.

This work led to a book, 'Project Sunshine: How science can use the sun to fuel and feed the world', co-authored by Ryan and Steve McKevitt, and published in 2013 by Icon Books. It was republished in paperback in 2014 as 'The Solar Revolution: One World. One Solution. Providing the Energy and Food for 10 Billion People'.

On 26 August 2014, the University of Sheffield announced it had received a £2.6m donation from the Grantham Foundation for the Protection of the Environment to found the Grantham Centre for Sustainable Futures, with funds matched by the university itself. The Grantham Centre, with Ryan as Director, builds on the work of Project Sunshine through an interdisciplinary PhD training programme that gives students (known as 'Grantham Scholars') the skills to become sustainability advocates, as well as experts in their particular fields of research. The Grantham Centre supports sustainability research at the University of Sheffield and Ryan represented the Grantham Centre at the United Nations Climate Change Conference in Paris in December 2015.

=== Arts collaborations ===
Ryan's arts collaborations include:

==== Wonderland ====
In 2005, Ryan began working with Professor Helen Storey from the Centre of Sustainable Fashion, London College of Fashion. Together they conceived the exhibition Wonderland to examine plastic packaging and explore new approaches to how it could be used and disposed of. The exhibition was hosted in London, Belfast and Sheffield throughout 2008. The 'Disappearing Dresses' from the exhibition went on to appear at the Royal Academy of Arts, London and toured Europe as part of the Futurotextiles exhibition in 2010/2011. A later exhibition, Plastic Is Precious: It's Buried Sunshine, explored similar themes with a focus on plastic shopping bags, and was held at Meadowhall shopping centre in Sheffield in 2013.

==== Catalytic Clothing ====
In 2010, Ryan and Storey launched Catalytic Clothing, to show how a photocatalyst that breaks down air borne pollutants could be applied to clothing and textiles, to improve air quality. The first Catalytic Clothing exhibition, Herself, featured a couture textile sculpture and was first show in Sheffield in October 2010, before appearing as part of Newcastle ScienceFest in 2011. It was shown in Dubai in 2012 and toured France in 2013.

A second exhibition, Field of Jeans, applied the photocatalyst to pairs of denim jeans, to illustrate how it could be used in everyday life. The exhibition appeared in Sheffield, Newcastle and London, and was developed into A Field of Jeans and Kilts for the Edinburgh International Science Festival before appearing at Manchester Science Festival in 2012.

==== In Praise of Air ====
Building on the concept of Catalytic Clothing, in 2014 Ryan worked with the poet and University of Sheffield colleague Simon Armitage to prepare a 10 meter by 20 meter size poster coated with microscopic, pollution eating nanoparticles of titanium dioxide. The giant poster hung from the side of the Alfred Denny Building at the university and absorbed the toxic emissions from around 20 cars each day. The poster was unveiled at the university's spoken word festival Lyric and featured a poem by Armitage written especially for the project, 'In Praise Of Air'.

=== Media work ===
Tony Ryan's voice
from the BBC programme The Life Scientific, 21 February 2012.

Ryan has worked extensively as a science communicator and commentator, and in 2002, he presented the Royal Institution Christmas Lectures. The series of five lectures was titled Smart Stuff and polymer chemistry was the underlying theme. The individual lectures were:

- The spider that spun a suspension bridge
- The trainer that ran over the world
- The phone that shrank the planet
- The plaster that stretches life
- The ice cream that will freeze granny

In 2005, Ryan became the Engineering and Physical Sciences Research Council's first Senior Media Fellow and has remained a regular commentator on science and sustainability issues in the media. He has appeared on BBC Radio 4 programmes including Start the Week, Material World, In Our Time and The Infinite Monkey Cage, and was the subject of a 2012 episode of The Life Scientific.

in 2021, Ryan launched a podcast alongside journalism Professor Marie Kinsey called Research Records where they interview academics about their academic career alongside a music soundtrack.

== Personal life ==
Ryan was born in Crossgates, Leeds, in March 1962. He is married and has two daughters Gemma and Maria. He is also a keen cyclist and in 2014 led a team from University of Sheffield on the Deloitte Ride Across Britain. The ride raised £44,000 for hearing research at the university and was followed in 2015 by The Big Walk, in which Ryan co-captained a 286-mile trek along the Pennine Way.
