= Tim O'Brien (physicist) =

British astronomer

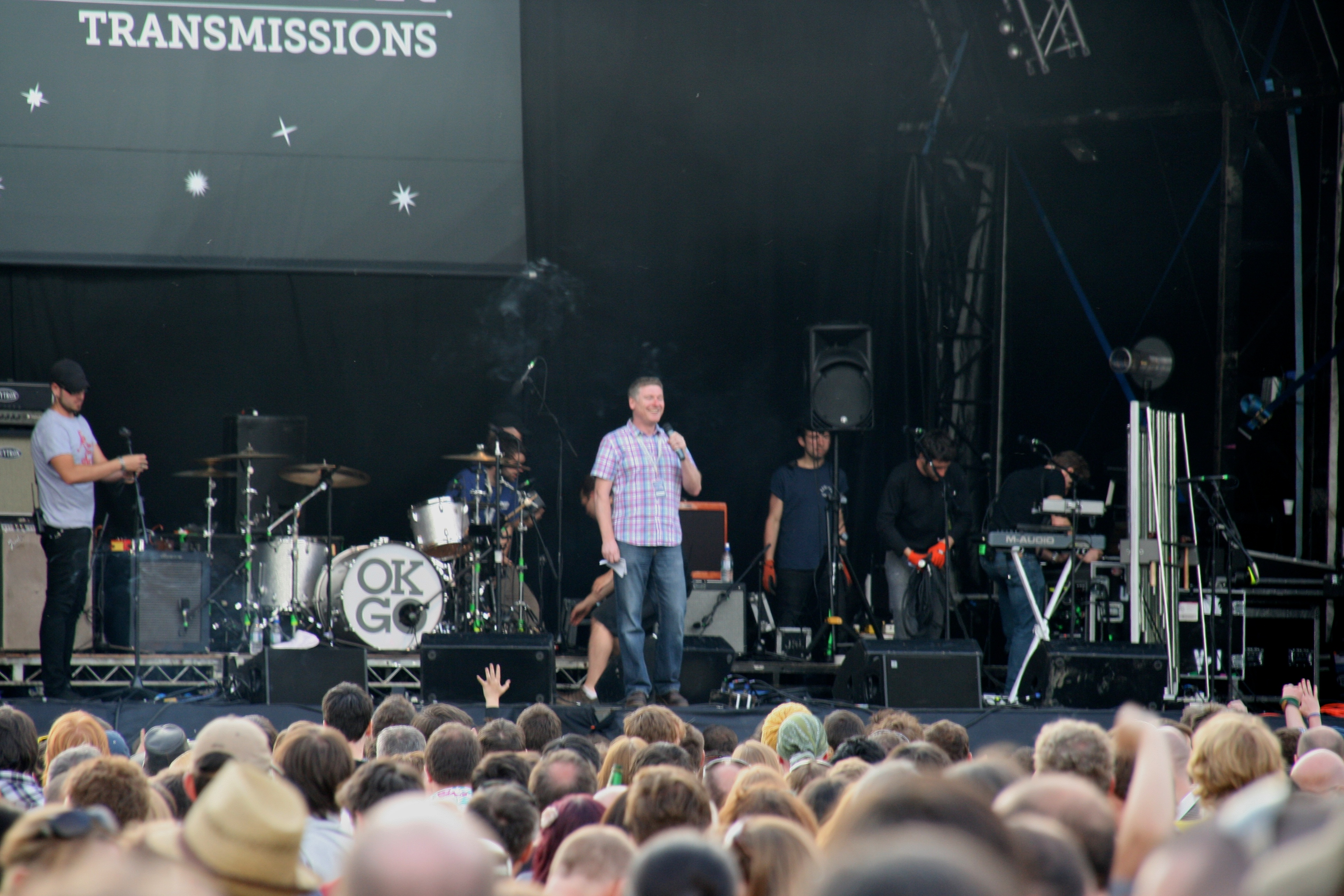
- Born: Timothy John O'Brien; 31 March 1964 (age 62)
- Education: University College London (BSc); University of Manchester (PhD)
- Known for: Multi-Element Radio Linked Interferometer Network (MERLIN); Bluedot Festival
- Spouse: Teresa Anderson
- Awards: Kelvin Prize (2014)
- Scientific career
- Workplaces: University of Manchester; Jodrell Bank Centre for Astrophysics; Liverpool John Moores University
- Thesis: A model for the remnant of the recurrent nova RS Ophiuchi (1985) (1990)
- Doctoral advisor: Franz Daniel Kahn
- Website: proftimobrien.com

Timothy John O'Brien (born 31 March 1964) is a British astronomer, currently working at the University of Manchester as Professor of Astrophysics. He often appears on the BBC.

== Early life and education ==
He was born in Littleborough, Greater Manchester. He grew up in Castleton, Greater Manchester in the Metropolitan Borough of Rochdale. He attended school in Rochdale., attending St Joseph's RC Middle School from 1975 to 1977, and Bishop Henshaw RC Memorial High School, now St Cuthbert's RC High School, from 1977 to 1982.

He studied Physics and Astrophysics at Queen Mary College and completed his PhD at the University of Manchester between 1985 and 1988.

== Career and research ==
He began working at the University of Manchester in 1999 where he is currently associate director of the Jodrell Bank Centre for Astrophysics. He is also Director of Teaching & Learning in the university's School of Physics & Astronomy. From 2009 to 2015, he taught the first year undergraduate course in Astrophysics.

His research is primarily in the area of novae (thermonuclear explosions on white dwarf stars in binary star systems) and includes both theoretical work and observations using telescopes around the world and in space working across the electromagnetic spectrum.

=== Broadcasting ===
He has appeared on Stargazing Live on BBC Two and The Infinite Monkey Cage on BBC Radio 4.

== Personal life ==
O'Brien is married to Professor Teresa Anderson (born 1 December 1962).

Academic offices
Preceded by	Professor of Astrophysics at the School of Physics and Astronomy, University of Manchester -	Succeeded by Incumbent
