= Erica McAlister =

British entomologist

Erica McAlister Hon.FRES
- Education: University of Manchester (BSc); University of Surrey, Roehampton (PhD)
- Scientific career
- Fields: Entomology; Biodiversity; Taxonomy; Public engagement Diptera
- Workplaces: Natural History Museum, London, Institute of Terrestrial Ecology, University of Adelaide
- Thesis: Invertebrate Colonisation and Succession on a Grazing Marsh, The Wetland Centre, London (2002)
- Website: www.nhm.ac.uk/our-science/departments-and-staff/staff-directory/erica-mcalister.html

Erica McAlister Hon.FRES is an entomologist, museum curator and presenter in the United Kingdom. She is an expert in flies (Diptera) and is senior curator at the Natural History Museum, London. She is a past President of the Amateur Entomologists' Society.

== Education and career ==
McAlister had a fascination for insects as a child and became seriously interested in entomology on a field course as part of her undergraduate degree at the University of Manchester, during which she did placements at the Institute of Terrestrial Ecology (now UKCEH) and the University of Adelaide in Australia. She graduated from Manchester in 1996 and then moved to the University of Surrey, Roehampton (now University of Roehampton) where she was awarded a PhD in 2002 for community ecology research at The London Wetland Centre. After volunteering at the Natural History Museum, lecturing part-time at the University of Roehampton and working elsewhere in the evenings, she joined the museum as a curator of Diptera in 2006, where her current position is senior curator of Diptera and Siphonaptera.

== Research ==
Her research involves systematics work on flies, and the hosts of flies that are parasites. She has carried out extensive field research, including in Costa Rica, Indonesia, Malaysia, Thailand, Vietnam. She has researched the pollinators and herbivores of potatoes and tomatoes in Peru, and has worked in Dominica with Operation Wallacea collecting insect specimens and inspiring young people. She has also looked at mosquitoes in Tajikistan and more recently she has looked at the genomes of historic fly specimens as part of project 'Neandersquito'.

== Public activities ==
McAlister is an advocate for the importance of flies, highlighting their ecosystem services such as pollination and decomposition, and the need for more research into Diptera as they are an understudied group compared to Coleoptera (beetles) and Lepidoptera (Moths and Butterflies) She is president of the Amateur Entomologists' Society, which she uses as a platform for science outreach and research communication. In 2019 she was part of the team running The Year of the Fly.

She gives regular public talks, such as about Insect Sex at the Natural History Museums's DinoSnores for Adults events and at the Royal Society's Summer Science Exhibition evening event in 2014'. In 2016 she gave keynote lecture at the EntoSci16 event for young people at Harper Adams University and has taken part in the Science Showoff and Museums Showoff comedy evenings. She is a regular speaker at London's PubSci events. In 2019 she took part in Hullabaloo on the Isle of Wight, with the National Poo Museum. In 2020 she talked at Cafe Scientifique Crystal Palace, gave an online talk as part of North Carolina Museum of Natural Sciences' BugFest and in 2021 gave the Royal Entomological Society's Verrall Lecture 'A Fascination of Flies'.

McAlister has presented several BBC Radio 4 programmes, including Who's the Pest? in 2013, an episode on George Henry Verrall as part of the Natural History Heroes series in 2015, and Metamorphosis - How Insects Transformed Our World in 2021. In 2019 she was interviewed by Jim Al-Khalili for The Life Scientific. She has also contributed to Radio 4 panel programmes such as The Living World where she talked to Miranda Krestovnikoff about winter flies, the Museum of Curiosity in 2012, Nature Table in 2020 and the Infinite Monkey Cage in 2021. In 2019 she featured on the BBC World Service programme The Real Story as part of discussion 'Is capitalism killing our planet, or is it our only hope?' and she talked on ABC's The Science Show about insects and climate change, in 2021 she contributed to NPR's All Things Considered talking about how hard it is to swat houseflies. She has also appeared on several podcasts including Science Friday, the SETI Institute and Scientific American in 2018.

She appeared in BBC2's Museum of Life television programme in 2010, on Christmas University Challenge in 2016 as part of the University of Manchester team and on Channel 5's Natural History Museum: World of Wonder in 2020.

The first edition of her book The Secret Life of Flies was published in 2017 and the sequel The Inside Out of Flies was published in 2020. In 2022 she published a book for children A Bug's World with illustrator Stephanie Fizer Coleman.

== Honours and awards ==
- Honorary Fellowship of the Royal Entomological Society in 2019
- ZSL/Clarivate Award for Communicating Zoology in 2018 for The Secret Life of Flies
- President of the Amateur Entomologist's Society from 2018

== Select publications ==
- McAlister, E. 2020. The Inside Out of Flies. Natural History Museum.
- McAlister, E. 2017. The Secret Life of Flies. Natural History Museum.
- McAlister, E.; Fizer Coleman, S (illustrator) 2022. A Bug's World. Hachette Children's Group.
- Rodrigues, P. F. M., McAlister E. Lamas, C.J.E. 2017. "Review of Marmasoma White with lectotype designation of M. sumptuosum White and an identification key to the Australasian/Oceanian genera of Ecliminae (Diptera, Bombyliidae)", Zootaxa 4232 (2).
- Habirov, Z., Kadamov, D., Iskandarov, F., Komilova, S., Cook, S., McAlister, E., and Harbach, R.E. 2012. "Malaria and the Anopheles mosquitoes of Tajikistan. Journal of Vector Ecology, 37 (2), 419-427.
- Lavigne, R. and McAlister, E. 2011. "A new species of Cerdistus (Insecta: Diptera: Asilidae) from Monarto Zoological Park, South Australia, with notes on its behaviour", The South Australian Naturalist, 85 (2), 76–84.
