= Major histocompatibility complex and sexual selection =

Adaptive immune gene selection

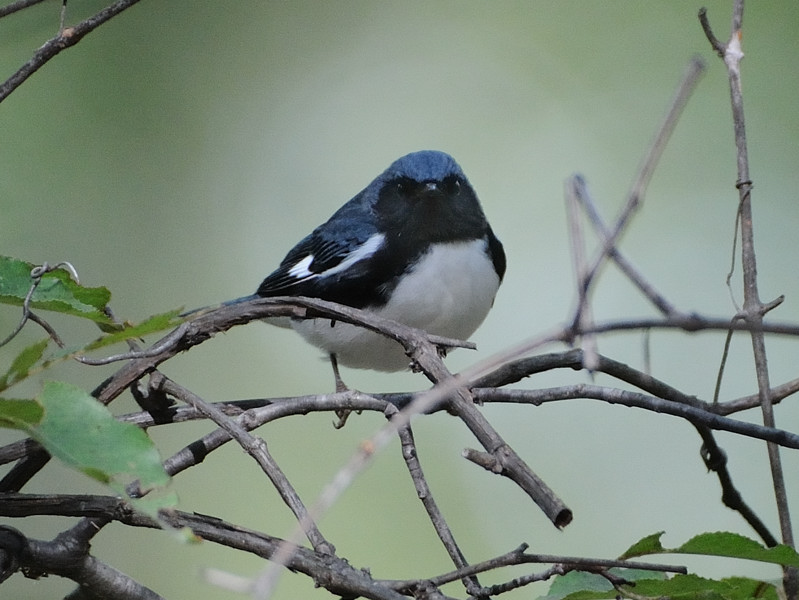
MHC sexual selection has been observed in the black-throated blue warbler.

Major histocompatibility complex (MHC) genes code for cell surface proteins that facilitate an organism's immune response to pathogens as well as its ability to avoid attacking its own cells. These genes have maintained an unusually high level of allelic diversity throughout time and throughout different populations. This means that for each MHC gene, many alleles (or gene variants) consistently exist within the population, and many individuals are heterozygous at MHC loci (meaning they possess two different alleles for a given gene locus).

The vast source of genetic variation affecting an organism's fitness stems from the co-evolutionary arms race between hosts and parasites. There are two hypotheses for explaining the MHC's high diversity, which are not mutually exclusive. One is that there is selection for individuals to possess a diverse set of MHC alleles, which would occur if MHC heterozygotes are more resistant to pathogens than homozygotes—this is called heterozygote advantage. The second is that there is selection that undergoes a frequency-dependent cycle—this is called the Red Queen hypothesis.

There is evidence that many vertebrates, including humans, select their mates based on signals of "compatibility" between their MHC alleles, with a preference for mates with different alleles than their own, resulting in pairings that would tend to produce more heterozygous offspring. There are several proposed hypotheses that address how MHC-associated mating preferences could be adaptive and how an unusually large amount of allelic diversity has been maintained in the MHC.

== Hypotheses ==
In the first hypothesis, if individuals heterozygous at the MHC are more resistant to parasites than those that are homozygous, then it is beneficial for females to choose mates with MHC genes different from their own, and would result in MHC-heterozygous offspring—this is known as disassortative mating. The hypothesis states that individuals with a heterozygous MHC would be capable of recognizing a wider range of pathogens and therefore of inciting a specific immune response against a greater number of pathogens—thus having an immunity advantage. Unfortunately, the MHC-heterozygote advantage hypothesis has not been adequately tested. Non-MHC immune genes across species exhibit heterozygote disadvantage, or no advantage. In mice, increased MHC heterozygosity reduces fitness, challenging this hypothesis. MHC-heterozygous females had significantly reduced fitness compared to homozygotes. This finding has been replicated in another study in mice and again in fish In some cases, excess heterozygosity can lead to decreased fitness.

The optimality hypothesis states too much variability in the MHC can result in a failure of T-cells to distinguish themselves non-selves, and thereby increase the risk of autoimmune disease. This would confer greater fitness to individuals without a large degree MHC diversity. Autoimmune diseases are associated with MHC loci. In humans, those with greater MHC diversity have a greater risk for autoimmune disorders. MHC diversity may be low "because foreign peptides have to stand out against the self-background." On an individual level, MHC diversity tends to be low. Across many species, there is intermediate heterozygosity in the MHC. Overall evidence supports intermediate MHC heterozygosity is best.

The Red Queen hypothesis asserts that MHC diversity is maintained by parasites. If individuals' MHC alleles render different resistances to a particular parasite, then the allele with the highest resistance is favored, selected for, and consequently spread throughout the population. Recombination and mutation cause generation of new variants among offspring, which may facilitate a quick response to rapidly evolving parasites or pathogens with much shorter generation times. However, if this particular allele becomes common, selection pressure on parasites to avoid recognition by this common allele increases. An advantageous characteristic that allows a parasite to escape recognition spreads, and causes selection against what was formerly a resistant allele. This enables the parasite to escape this cycle of frequency-dependent selection, and such a cycle eventually leads to a co-evolutionary arms race that may support the maintenance of MHC diversity. This hypothesis has empirical support.

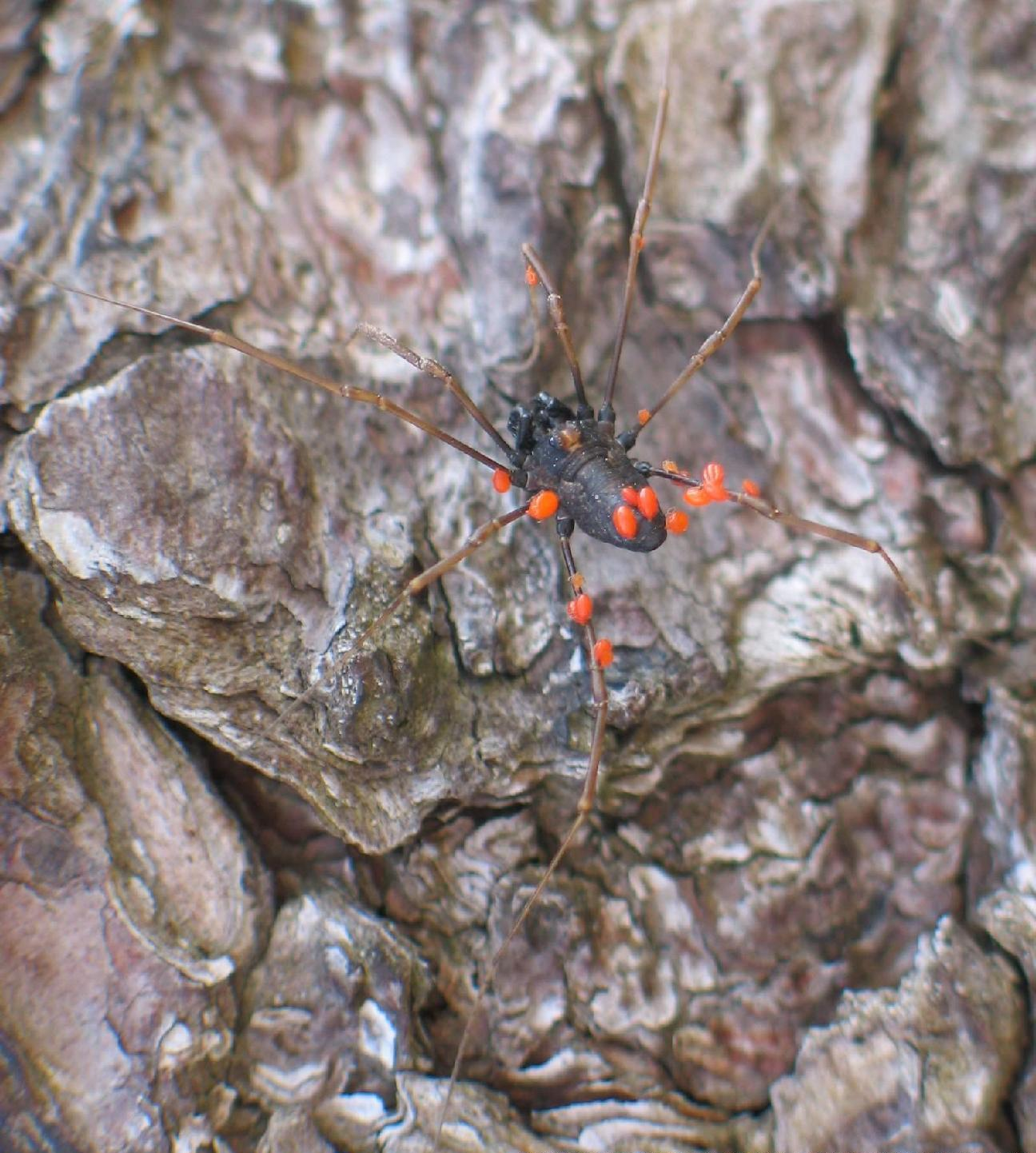
Parasites are in a constant arms race with their host: harvestman suffering from mite pest

The inbreeding avoidance hypothesis has less to do with host-parasite relationships than does the heterozygote advantage hypothesis or the Red Queen hypothesis. The extreme diversity in the MHC would cause individuals sharing MHC alleles to be more likely to be related. As a result, one function of MHC-disassortative mating would be to avoid mating with family members and any harmful genetic consequences that could occur as a result. The hypothesis states that inbreeding increases the amount of overall homozygosity—not just locally in the MHC, so an increase in genetic homozygosity may be accompanied not only by the expression of recessive diseases and mutations, but by the loss of any potential heterozygote advantage as well. Animals only rarely avoid inbreeding. The inbreeding avoidance hypothesis has been "ruled out as an explanation for the observed pattern of MHC-dependent mate preference" because relatedness is not associated with mate choice.

In the course of searching for potential mates, it would benefit females to be able to discriminate against "bad" genes in order to increase the health and viability of their offspring. If female mate choice occurs for "good" genes, then it is implied that genetic variation exists among males. Furthermore, one would presume that said difference in genes would impart a difference in fitness as well, which could potentially be chosen or selected for.

Generally, the extreme polymorphism of MHC genes is selected for by host-parasite arms races (the Red Queen hypothesis); however, disassortative mate choice may maintain genetic diversity in some species. Depending on how parasites alter selection on MHC alleles, MHC-dependent mate-choice may increase the fitness of the offspring by enhancing its immunity, as mentioned earlier. If this is the case, either through the heterozygote advantage hypothesis or the Red Queen hypothesis, then selection also favors mating practices that are MHC-dependent.

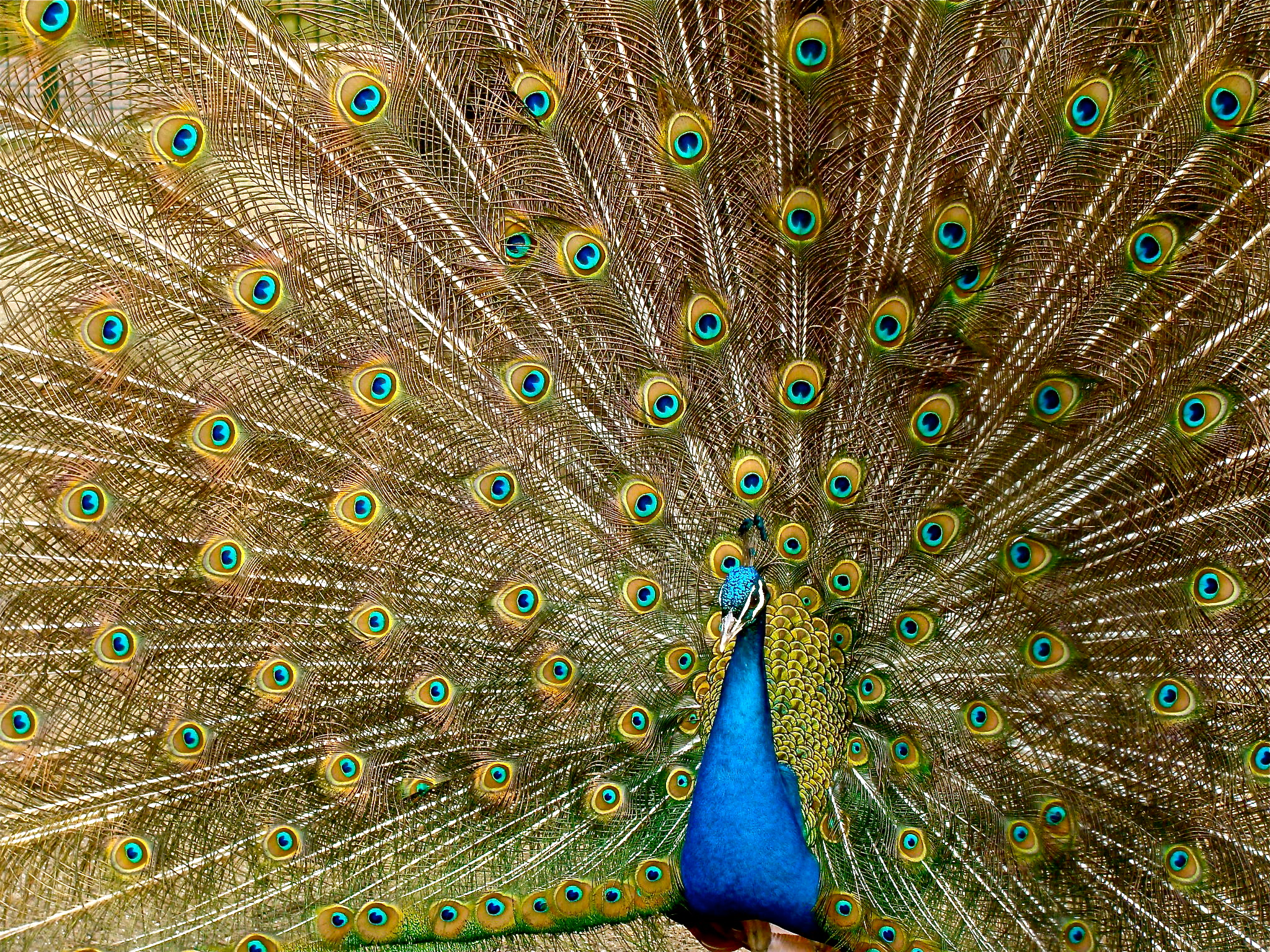
The exaggerated, elongated upper tail coverts make up the "train" of the peacock.

Therefore, mate choice—with respect to the MHC—has probably evolved so that females choose males either based on diverse genes (heterozygote advantage and inbreeding avoidance hypotheses) or "good" genes. The fact that females choose is naturally selected, as it would be an advantageous trait for females to be able to choose a male that provided either an indirect or direct benefit. As a result of female choice, sexual selection is imposed on males. This is evidenced by genetic "advertisement"—an example of this would be the existence of exaggerated traits, such as the elaborate tail-feathers of male peacocks. However, in humans, both sexes exert mate choice.

== The relationship between olfaction and MHC ==
MHC-based sexual selection is known to involve olfactory mechanisms in such vertebrate taxa as fish, mice, humans, primates, birds, and reptiles. At its simplest level, humans have long been acquainted with the sense of olfaction for its use in determining the pleasantness or the unpleasantness of one's resources, food, etc. At a deeper level, it has been predicted that olfaction serves to personally identify individuals based upon the genes of the MHC.

Human olfactory system. 1: Olfactory bulb 2: Mitral cells 3: Bone 4: Nasal epithelium 5: Glomerulus (olfaction) 6: Olfactory receptor cells

Chemosensation, which is one of the most primitive senses, has evolved into a specialized sensory system. Humans can not only detect, but also assess, and respond to environmental (chemical) olfactory cues—especially those used to evoke behavioral and sexual responses from other individuals, also known as pheromones. Pheromones function to communicate one's species, sex, and perhaps most importantly one's genetic identity. The genes of the MHC provide the basis from which a set of unique olfactory coding develops.

Although it is not known exactly how MHC-specific odors are recognized, it is currently believed that proteins bound to the peptide-binding groove of the MHC may produce the odorant. Each MHC protein binds to a specific peptide sequence, yielding a set of uniquely bound peptide-MHC complexes for each individual. During cellular turnover, the MHC-peptide complex is shed from the cell surface and the fragments are dispensed in bodily fluids such as blood serum, saliva, and urine. Scientists believe that commensal microflora, microorganisms that line epithelial surfaces open to the external environment such as the gastrointestinal tract and vagina, further degrade these fragments, which are made volatile by this process. Recently, it has been shown that receptors in the vomeronasal organ of mice are activated by peptides having similar characteristics to MHC proteins; further studies may hopefully soon clarify the exact transformation between MHC genotype and an olfactory mechanism.

== Empirical evidence ==
=== In humans ===
MHC similarity in humans has been studied in three broad ways: odor, facial attractiveness, and actual mate choice. Studies of odor find MHC-dissimilarity preferences but vary in details, while facial attractiveness favors MHC-similarity and actual mating studies are varied.

==== Specific studies ====
Several studies suggest that MHC-related odor preferences and mate choice are demonstrated by humans. However, the role of MHC in human mate choice has been relatively controversial. One study conducted by Ober et al. examined HLA types from 400 couples in the Hutterite community and found dramatically fewer HLA matches between husbands and wives than expected when considering the social structure of their community. On the other hand, there was no evidence of MHC-based mate choice in the same study of 200 couples from South Amerindian tribes.

Other studies have approached mate choice based on odor preference. In one study done by Wedekind et al., women were asked to smell male axillary odors collected on T-shirts worn by different males. Women that were ovulating rated the odors of MHC-dissimilar men as more pleasant than those of the MHC-similar men. Furthermore, odors of MHC-dissimilar men often reminded women of current or former partners, suggesting that odor—specifically odor for MHC-dissimilarity—plays a role in mate choice.

In another study done by Wedekind et al., 121 women and men were asked to rank the pleasantness of the odors of sweaty T-shirts. Upon smelling the shirts, it was found that men and women who were reminded of their own mate or ex-mate had dramatically fewer MHC alleles in common with the wearer than would be expected by chance. If the selection for shirts was not random, and actually selected for MHC-dissimilar alleles, this suggests that MHC genetic composition does influence mate choice. Furthermore, when the degree of similarity between the wearer and the smeller was statistically accounted for, there was no longer a significant influence of MHC on odor preference. The results show that MHC similarity or dissimilarity certainly plays a role in mate choice. Specifically, MHC-disassortative mate choice and less similar MHC combinations are selected for. One interesting aspect of the Wedekind's experiment was that in contrast to normally cycling women, women taking oral contraceptives preferred odors of MHC-similar men. This would suggest that the pill may interfere with the adaptive preference for dissimilarity.

=== In primates ===
There is evidence of MHC-associated mate choice in other primates. In the grey mouse lemur Microcebus murinus, post-copulatory mate-choice is associated with genetic constitution. Fathers are more MHC-dissimilar from the mother than are randomly tested males. Fathers have more differences in amino acid and microsatellite diversity than did randomly tested males. It is hypothesized that this is caused by female cryptic choice.

=== In other animals ===
In mice, both males and females choose MHC-dissimilar partners. Mice develop the ability to identify family members during early growth and are known to avoid inbreeding with kin, which would support the MHC-mediated mate choice hypothesis for inbreeding avoidance.

Fish are another group of vertebrates shown to display MHC-associated mate choice. Scientists tested the Atlantic salmon, Salmo salar, by observing effects of MHC upon natural spawning salmon that resided in the river versus artificial crosses that were carried out in hatcheries. Logically, the artificial crosses would be bereft of the benefits of mate choice that would naturally be available. The results showed that the offspring of the artificially bred salmon were more infected with parasites: almost four times more than the naturally-spawned offspring were. In addition, wild offspring were more MHC-heterozygous than the artificially-bred offspring. These results support the Heterozygous Advantage hypothesis of sexual selection for MHC-dissimilar mate choice. In another fish, the three-spined stickleback, it has been shown that females desire MHC diversity in their offspring, which affects their mate choice.

Female Savannah sparrows, Passerculus sandwichensis, chose MHC-dissimilar males to mate with. Females are more likely to engage in extra-pair relationships if paired with MHC-similar mates and more dissimilar mates are available. Similarly, MHC diversity in house sparrows, Passer domesticus, suggests that MHC-disassortative mate choice occurs.

MHC-mediated mate choice has been shown to exist in Swedish sand lizards, Lacerta agilis. Females preferred to associate with odor samples obtained from males more distantly related at the MHC I loci.

Even though many species are socially monogamous, females can accept or actively seek mating outside of the relationship; extra-pair paternity is a mating pattern known to be affiliated with MHC-associated mate choice. Birds are one of the more commonly studied groups of animals to exhibit this sexual behavior. In the scarlet rosefinch Carpocus erythrinus, females engaged in extra-pair paternity much less frequently when their mates were MHC-heterozygous. In the Seychelles warbler Acrocephalus sechellensis, there was no evidence of MHC variation between social mates. However, when females' social mates were MHC-similar, they were more likely to participate in extra-pair paternity; in most cases, the extra-pair male was significantly more MHC-dissimilar than the social mate.

MHC-mediated mate choice may occur after copulation, at the gametic level, through sperm competition or female cryptic choice. The Atlantic salmon, Salmo salar, is one species in which sperm competition is influenced by the variation in the major histocompatibility complex, specifically that of the Class I alleles. Atlantic salmon males have higher rates of successful fertilization when competing for eggs from females genetically similar at the class I genes of the MHC.

Another species that exhibits MHC-associated cryptic choice is the Arctic charr Salvelinus alpinus. In this case, however, it seems that sperm selection is more dependent on the ovum. MHC-heterozygous males were found to have significantly more fertilization success than MHC-homozygous males; sperm count, motility, and swimming velocity were not shown to significantly co-vary with similarity or dissimilarity at the MHC. It is proposed that there is a chemo-attraction system responsible for the egg itself being able to discriminate and selectively choose between MHC-heterozygous and MHC-homozygous males.

Contrary to the Atlantic salmon and the Arctic char, red junglefowl Gallus gallus males instead of females exert cryptic preference. Male junglefowl showed no preference when simultaneously presented with both an MHC-dissimilar and an MHC-similar female. However, they did show a cryptic preference by allocating more sperm to the more MHC-dissimilar of the two.

Male sand lizards Lacerta agilis behave similarly to the male junglefowl. Initial copulation between a male and a female without any rivals was shown to be extended when the male sensed a higher female fecundity. However, second males adjusted the duration of their copulation depending on the relatedness between the female and the first male, believed to be determined by the MHC-odor of the copulatory plug. A closer genetic relatedness between a male and a female sand lizard increased the chances for a successful fertilization and rate of paternity for the second male.

Abortional selection may be a form of cryptic female choice. Many studies on humans and rodents have found that females may spontaneously abort pregnancies in which the offspring is too MHC-similar. In addition, in vitro fertilizations are more likely to fail when couples have similar MHC genes.

== MHC and sexual conflict ==
If males attempt to thwart female mate choice by mating with a female against her will, sexual conflict may interfere with the choice for compatibility at the MHC genes.

In Chinook salmon Oncorhyncus tshawytscha, females act more aggressively towards MHC-similar males than MHC-dissimilar males, suggesting the presence of female mate choice. Furthermore, males directed aggression at MHC-similar females. This was accompanied by male harassment of unreceptive females; however, there was a positive correlation between male aggression and reproductive success. The ability of the males to over-power the females' original mate choice resulted in the offspring of the targets of male aggression having low genetic diversity. Offspring with high genetic diversity seemed to happen only when the operational sex ratio was female-biased, when females were more likely to be able to exert mate choice, and males were less likely to harass females. These results suggest that sexual conflict may interfere with female mate choice for 'good' MHC genes.

== See also ==
- Body odor
- Body odor and subconscious human sexual attraction
- Pheromone
- The Compatibility Gene
