= Colva Roney-Dougal =

British mathematician

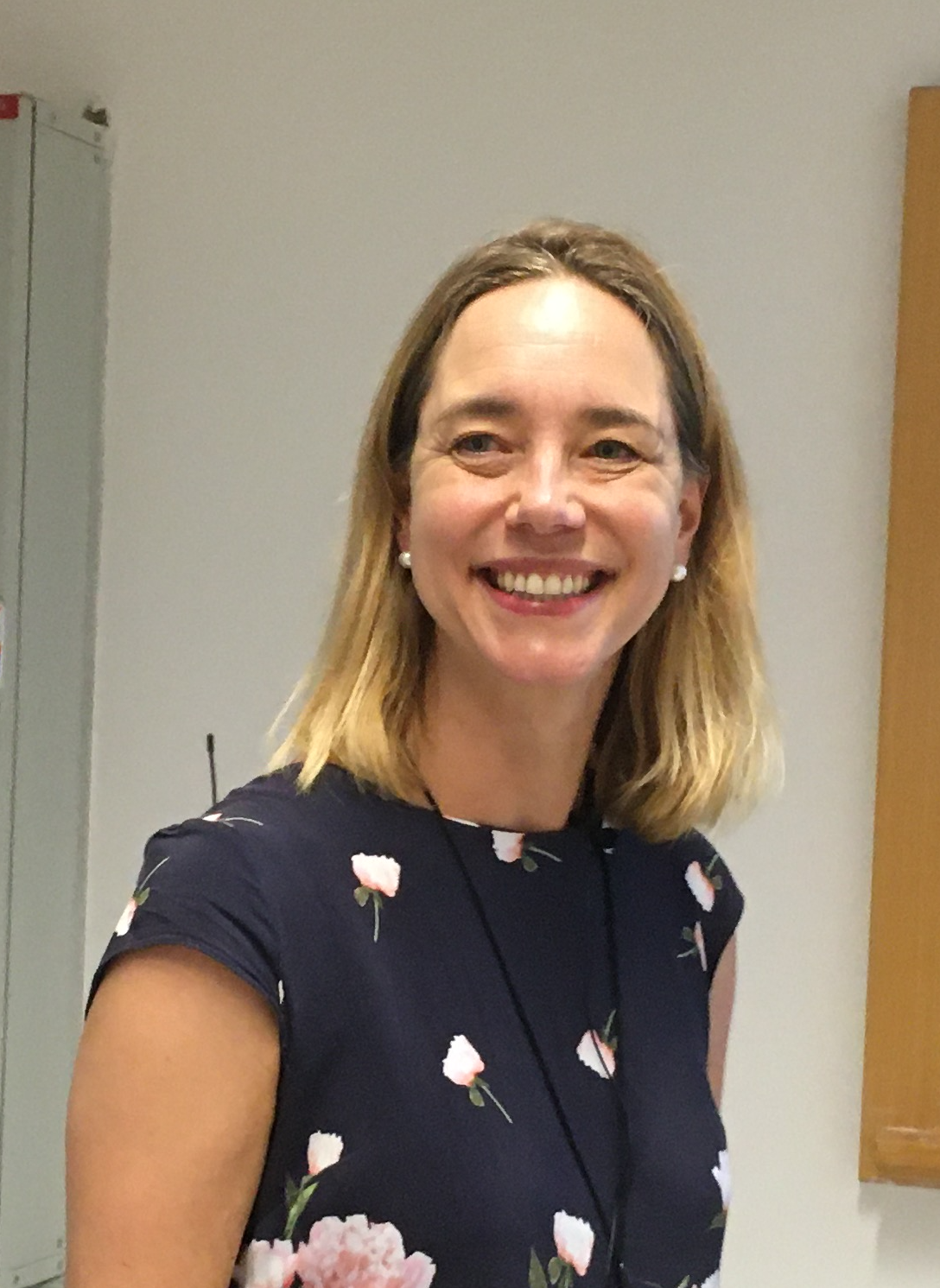
- Roney-Dougal in 2024
- Scientific career
- Fields: Mathematics
- Workplaces: University of St. Andrews

Colva Mary Roney-Dougal OBE FRSE is a British mathematician specializing in group theory and computational algebra. She is Professor of Pure Mathematics at the University of St Andrews, and the Director of the Centre for Interdisciplinary Research in Computational Algebra at St Andrews. She is also known for her popularization of mathematics on BBC radio shows, including appearances on In Our Time about the mathematics of Emmy Noether and Pierre-Simon Laplace and on The Infinite Monkey Cage about the nature of infinity and numbers in the real world.

== Education ==
Roney-Dougal completed her PhD at the University of London in 2001. Her dissertation, Permutation Groups with a Unique Non-diagonal Self-paired Orbital, was supervised by Peter Cameron.

== Book ==
With John Bray and Derek Holt, Roney-Dougal is the co-author of the book The Maximal Subgroups of the Low-Dimensional Finite Classical Groups (London Mathematical Society and Cambridge University Press, 2013).

== Recognition ==
In 2015 she was given the inaugural Cheryl E. Praeger Visiting Research Fellowship, funding her to visit the University of Western Australia.

Roney-Dougal was appointed Officer of the Order of the British Empire (OBE) in the 2024 New Year Honours for services to education and mathematics.

In April 2026, Roney-Dougal was elected a Fellow of the Royal Society of Edinburgh, in the discipline of informatics, mathematics and statistics
