= Tamsin Mather =

Professor of Earth Sciences

Tamsin Mather OBE FRS MAE
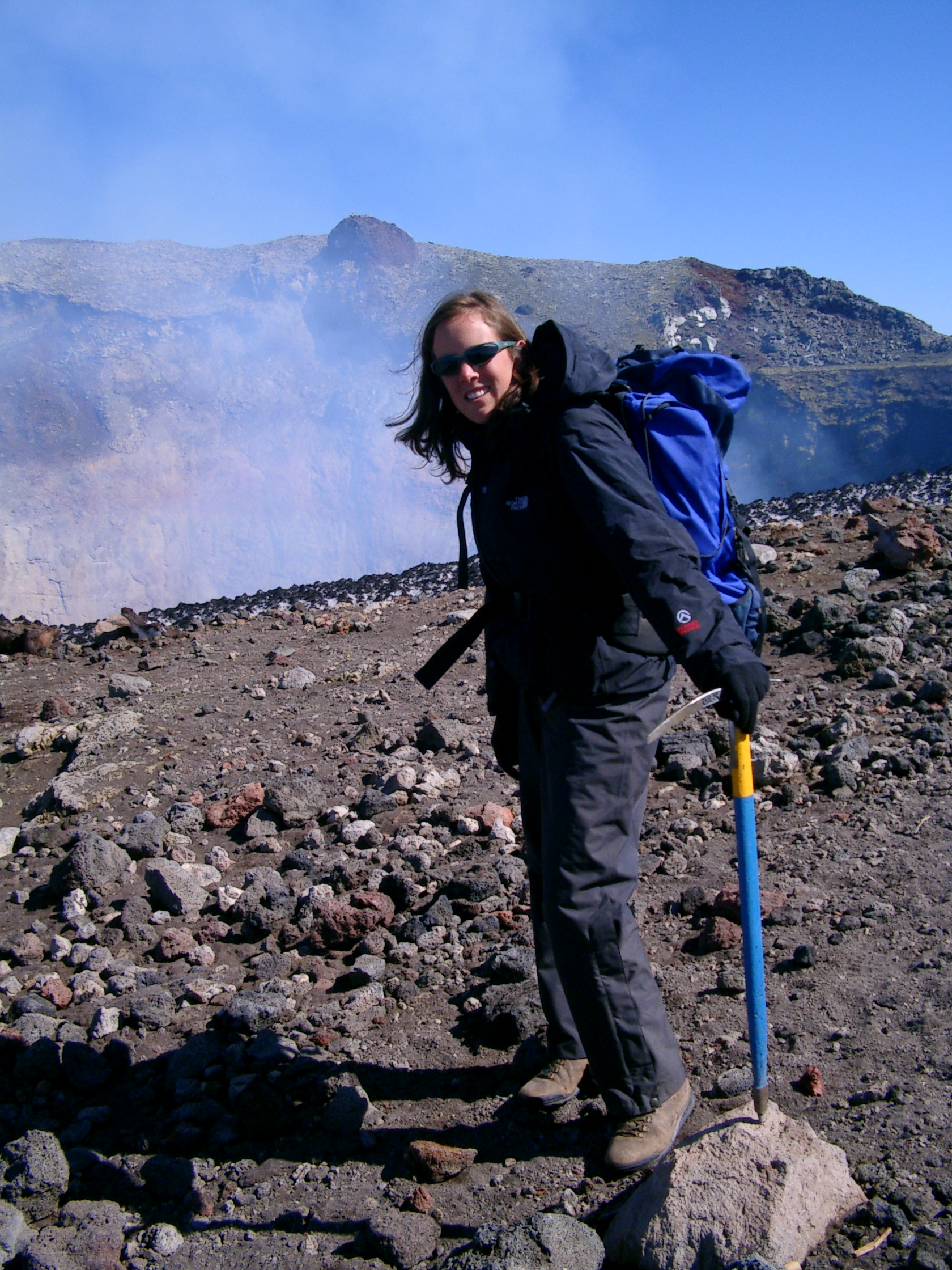
- Tamsin Mather at the summit of Villarrica volcano, Chile in 2003
- Born: Tamsin Alice Mather; 1976 (age 49–50); Bristol, England
- Education: University of Cambridge (MSci, MPhil, PhD)
- Children: Two
- Awards: Fellow of the Royal Society (2024); Geochemistry Fellow (2022); Member of the Academia Europaea (2021); Rosalind Franklin Award (2018); Philip Leverhulme Prize (2010); L'Oréal-UNESCO For Women in Science Award (2008)
- Scientific career
- Fields: Volcanology; Atmospheric chemistry
- Workplaces: University of Oxford
- Thesis: Near-source chemistry of tropospheric volcanic plumes (2004)
- Website: www.earth.ox.ac.uk/people/mather

Tamsin Alice Mather OBE FRS MAE (born 1976) is a British Professor of Earth Sciences at the Department of Earth Sciences, University of Oxford and a Fellow of University College, Oxford. She studies volcanic processes and their impacts on the Earth's environment and has appeared on the television and radio.

== Education ==
Mather was born and raised in Bristol, the daughter of William Mather and Felicity Mather. She was educated at St John's College, Cambridge, where she was awarded a Master of Science degree in 1999, a Master of Philosophy (MPhil) degree in 2000 and a Doctor of Philosophy degree in 2004. As an undergraduate she studied the Natural Sciences Tripos before switching to the History and Philosophy of Science for her MPhil (in the same MPhil class as Helen Macdonald and Katherine Angel). She spent a year working abroad before returning to science for her PhD which was completed in the Department of Earth Sciences and investigated the chemistry of volcanic plumes in the troposphere. Her PhD involved working in Chile, Nicaragua and Italy.

== Career and research ==
Mather studies volcanic behaviour working to understand volcanoes as natural hazards, planetary scale processes and natural resources. Mather is a Professor of Earth Sciences at the University of Oxford and a fellow of University College, Oxford.

She is part of the Centre for the Observation and Modeling of Earthquakes, Volcanoes and Tectonics (COMET) project, which is a "collaborative centre for understanding tectonic and volcanic processes and hazards though the integrated application of Earth Observation (EO) data, ground-based measurements, and geophysical models".

Other current projects include: the European Research Council funded project Revealing hidden volcanic triggers for global environmental change events in Earth's geological past using mercury (Hg); Rethinking Natural Resources funded by the Oxford Martin School.

Previous projects include the Natural Environment Research Council (NERC) funded RiftVolc project, researching past and current volcanism and volcanic hazards in the main Ethiopian rift; the Natural Environment Research Council (NERC) funded Volatiles, Geodynamics & Solid Earth Controls on the Habitable Planet programme researching deep Earth influences in the long-term evolution of the Earth; the Natural Environment Research Council (NERC) and Economic and Social Research Council (ESRC) Strengthening Resilience in Volcanic Areas collaboration, (STREVA) which looked to establish a risk assessment framework for volcanoes.

Her research into the role of volcanism in planetary scale processes includes the discovery that volcanic vents perform nitrogen fixation making it available to for use by life, possibly a significant source on the early Earth as life was evolving. and the potential of the element mercury as a tracer for past large-scale volcanism with widespread environmental impacts including mass extinction events.

Mather's other research includes investigations into volcanic plumes, the effects of volcanic emissions and aerosols on the environment, and the structure and stability of volcanoes. She has also studied the emissions from Buncefield fire at the Buncefield oil depot in 2005 and is interested in the mercury cycle, as well as other biogeochemical cycles.

Mather has led or collaborated on work studying volcanoes around the world, both in situ and using remote sensing data from ground or satellite based platforms. Volcanoes Mather has studied include Bárðarbunga, Hekla, and Eyjafjallajökull in Iceland, the Santorini caldera in Greece, the Villarica, Lascar, Chaitén and Calbuco volcanoes in Chile, Masaya Volcano in Nicaragua (where she was held up at gunpoint), Mount Etna in Italy, Galeras in Colombia, the Santiaguito lava dome complex in Guatemala, and the Great Rift Valley, Ethiopia.

Mather's research has been funded by the Natural Environment Research Council (NERC), the Science and Technology Facilities Council (STFC), the European Research Council and the Royal Society.

In 2005 she served as a Parliamentary Office of Science and Technology (POST) Fellow producing a POSTnote note on Carbon capture and storage, she served as co-editor-in-chief of Earth and Planetary Science Letters 2014–2019, on the board of directors of the Geochemical Society 2017–2019, on the Natural Environment Research Council Science Board/Committee 2017–2021 and on the International Continental Scientific Drilling Program Science Advisory Group 2019–2022. She currently serves as the Chair of the Volcanic and Magmatic Studies Group for UK and Ireland and the Police Science Council.

=== Media and outreach ===
In 2016 Mather appeared on the BBC World Service discussing volcanoes and earthquakes. Mather was interviewed on BBC Radio 4's The Life Scientific in 2017. She has taken part in Pint of Science, lectured at the Royal Institution and appeared on podcasts. She was a guest on The Infinite Monkey Cage alongside Jo Brand and Clive Oppenheimer in February 2018 and spoke at New Scientist Live in 2018. and was again a guest on The Infinite Monkey Cage in July 2023

In 2024 she published her first book 'Adventures in Volcanoland' in the UK (Abacus) and USA (Hanover Square Press).

=== Awards and honours ===
- 2024: Elected a Fellow of the Royal Society
- 2022: Appointed a geochemistry fellow by the European Association of Geochemistry
- 2021: Elected a Member of the Academia Europaea (MAE)
- 2018: Awarded the Rosalind Franklin Award of the Royal Society.
- 2010: Awarded the Philip Leverhulme Prize by the Leverhulme Trust.
- 2008: Awarded the national L'Oréal-UNESCO For Women in Science Award.
- 2005: Awarded a Dorothy Hodgkin Research Fellowship by the Royal Society, which funded the study of volatile emissions from volcanoes.
