= Andrea Sella =

Italian-born chemist

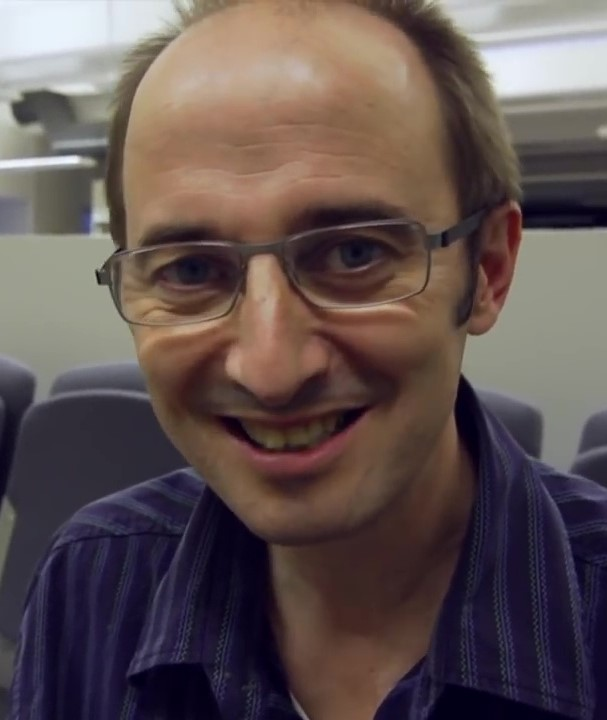
- Born: 1961 (age 64–65); Milan, Italy
- Occupations: Chemist, educator and broadcaster
- Children: 2
- Awards: Royal Society Michael Faraday Prize (2014)
- Scientific career
- Workplaces: University College London
- Thesis: Organometallic Chemistry (1986)
- Doctoral advisor: Malcolm Green

Andrea Sella (born February 1961) is a chemist and broadcaster based at University College London where he is a Professor of Inorganic Chemistry.

He studies rare-earth metals and collaborates with several research groups on hydrogen storage, carbonitrides, and nanotube insertion chemistry. He has been involved in numerous television documentaries, including the 2010 BBC documentary Chemistry: A Volatile History, which was nominated for the 2010 British Academy Television Awards in the category Specialist Factual. In 2014 he presented "My Family and other Ibex" and "Urine Trouble: What's in our Water" on BBC Radio 4. He has been a guest on Melvyn Bragg's In Our Time and appeared regularly on radio programmes like Start the Week, Weekend, Newshour, the Today Programme and the Infinite Monkey Cage. He has been consultant and contributor for the BBC World Service's series "Elemental Economics" presented by Justin Rowlatt.

== Early life ==
Sella was born in Milan, Italy, in 1961, but grew up in New York, USA, and Nairobi, Kenya.

He studied chemistry at Trinity College, University of Toronto, as an undergraduate and started research for a PhD under Professor Robert H. Morris on molecular hydrogen compounds. He obtained a D.Phil. in Chemistry from 1986–1990 at Balliol College, Oxford studying with Professor Malcolm Green.

== Career ==
Sella was appointed Lecturer at UCL in 1990. He was awarded an EPSRC Senior Media Fellowship from 2007 to 2012. He was promoted to Professor in 2012. His research interests include the molecular chemistry of the lanthanides, the confinement of elemental phosphorus inside carbon nanotubes, and the synthesis and properties of layered carbonitrides.

His monthly column in the Royal Society of Chemistry's Chemistry World, "Classic Kit", with guest contributions by his Masters student, Talitha Humphrey and others, explores the history of chemistry through the lens of scientific apparatus.

He is also well known for science demonstrations for both school children and adults. He sits on the Scientific Advisory Board of the Cheltenham Science Festival.

He was awarded the 2014 Michael Faraday Prize from the Royal Society for "his excellent work in science communication".

Since February 2014, he has been a frequent guest speaker in a BBC World Service radio programme called "Elements". He explains how chemical elements behave, react, and how they are used. In the programme that aired on 16 September 2016 featuring thorium, he temporarily replaced Justin Rowlatt as the host.

He has also presented several programmes on BBC Radio 4 and BBC World Service.

Sella returned his Michael Faraday Prize in June 2025 over the Royal Society's "failure to take stronger action against Elon Musk, a fellow of the UK academy, for presiding over 'onslaughts on US science."
