= Dan Davis (immunologist) =

UK immunologist, born August 1970

Daniel Michael Davis MBE FMedSci (born 2 August 1970) is head of life sciences and professor of immunology at Imperial College London. Davis was previously professor of immunology at the University of Manchester. He is the author of Immune Health, The Secret Body, The Beautiful Cure and The Compatibility Gene. His research, using microscopy to study immune cell biology has helped understand how immune cells interact with each other.

He co-discovered the immunological synapse and membrane nanotubes.

== Education ==
Davis has a doctorate in physics from Strathclyde University.

== Career ==
Davis was previously a Professor of Immunology at the University of Manchester and Director of Research in the Manchester Collaborative Centre for Inflammation Research, an institute funded by the University of Manchester, AstraZeneca and GSK. Davis first studied the immune system as a postdoc with Prof. Jack Strominger at Harvard University. He become a Professor of Immunology in Imperial College at age 35. Davis is a recognised as an expert in the field by the Nature journal of immunology.

== Science communication ==
Davis often speaks at science, literary and music festivals. He has written for the Times, Sunday Times, Observer, Guardian, New Scientist, Wired, and Scientific American. He has appeared on several radio and TV programs, including The Infinite Monkey Cage for BBC radio 4.

== Research ==
Working with Jack Strominger at Harvard University, Davis showed structured immune synapses for the natural killer cell. Davis also co-discovered membrane nanotubes, novel subcellular structures that allow trafficking of molecules and organelles between cells, and are exploited by pathogens.
