= The Compatibility Gene =

2013 book by Daniel M. Davis

- Author: Daniel M. Davis
- Subject: Immunology
- Genre: Popularisation of science
- Publisher: Allen Lane/Penguin
- Publication date: 2013

The Compatibility Gene is a 2013 book about the discovery of the mechanism of compatibility in the human immune system by the English professor of immunology, Daniel M. Davis. It describes the history of immunology with the discovery of the principle of graft rejection by Peter Medawar in the 1950s, and the way the body distinguishes self from not-self via natural killer cells. The compatibility mechanism contributes also to the success of pregnancy by helping the placenta to form, and may play a role in mate selection.

== Context ==
=== Author ===
Daniel M. Davis has a doctorate in physics from Strathclyde University. He was professor of molecular immunology at Imperial College London and director of research at the University of Manchester's collaborative centre for inflammation research. Davis is a recognised as an expert in the field by the Nature journal of immunology. Davis is a recognised expert for his research in the immune synapse, membrane nanotubes, and natural killer cells.

=== Subject ===
The book's context is the history of immunology, from the earliest questioning about why people become ill and why some may recover, to the 19th-century pioneers who demonstrated that bacteria caused many diseases. In the 20th century where, slowly at first but at an accelerating pace, biologists started to build an understanding of the genetic basis of variation and natural selection, and alongside that, the foundations of scientific medicine, including immunology. As Steven Pinker observes, few stories of scientific endeavour have never been told. "This is one of them. Ostensibly about a set of genes that we all have and need, this book is really about the men and women who discovered them and worked out what they do. It’s about brilliant insights and lucky guesses; the glory of being proved right and the paralysing fear of getting it wrong; the passion for cures and the lust for Nobels. It’s a search for the essence of scientific greatness by a scientist who is headed that way himself."

== Book ==
=== Contents ===
Diagram showing the complementary activities of cytotoxic T cells and natural killer cells

The book is in three parts. In part 1, Davis describes the history of research into biological compatibility, starting with the story of Peter Medawar's life and discoveries in graft rejection. He tours the history of medicine from Hippocrates to the 19th century pioneers Louis Pasteur and Robert Koch, and Frank Macfarlane Burnet's concept of the immune system's ability to discriminate self from non-self. He explains how advances in understanding of immunity, from Karl Landsteiner's discovery of the ABO blood group system onwards, permit organ transplants to take place. The compatibility genes are named as three class I human leucocyte antigen (HLA) genes (A, B, and C) and three class II (DP, DQ, and DR), each with numerous versions (alleles). Lastly, Davis tells the human side of the story of the discovery of killer T-cells. Alan Townsend found that killer T-cells destroyed cells that carried an HLA protein and small fragments of viral protein. Those small peptides were all the evidence the T-cells needed to decide that a cell was diseased.

In part 2, Davis describes the nature of the genetic differences between people, like having the allele for Huntington's disease, can be small but decisive. An HLA protein variant, B*27, is associated with a serious inherited disease, ankylosing spondylitis, but also protects against AIDS. Other variants protected against other diseases. Perhaps the polymorphisms in HLA, the many forms each HLA gene can take, are maintained by natural selection for competing factors. He explains that variations in HLA genes may predict which drugs will be beneficial for individuals, implying a new era of personalised medicine. He tells the story of how Klas Kärre came up with the concept of the missing self, a sign (by the absence of an HLA protein) that a cell was diseased, and should be killed by a natural killer cell.

In part 3, Davis describes the famous experiment that called for female partners to sniff boxes containing their male partners' T-shirts, which they had worn for two days. There was a slight association between finding the smell sexy and the two partners having different compatibility genes. It could possibly indicate sexual selection for outbreeding, at least in the HLA system. He explains what is known of the role of compatibility genes in the brain. He tells the story of how the variable genes of the immune system affect the success of pregnancy. Far from the baby's HLA proteins somehow being tolerated by the mother (unlike anyone else's), the strong reaction against the baby's antigens helps to drive proper development of the placenta, in particular the growth of chorionic villi that ensure efficient transfer (for instance of oxygen) between mother and baby. Davis concludes the book by telling a story of genetic compatibility between his wife and himself. He finds himself wondering whether all women should have found him exceptionally attractive, at least when he was younger. He observes that on the contrary there is no hierarchy in HLA: some variants are good in one situation, and bad in another.

=== Publication ===
The book was first published in the UK by Allen Lane (hardback) in 2013. Paperback editions were brought out by Penguin Books in Britain, and by Oxford University Press in America, both in 2014. An Italian translation was published by Bollati Boringhieri in Turin in 2016.

=== Reception ===
The Compatibility Gene has been well received by critics and scientists. Mark Viney, reviewing the book in the New Scientist, comments that Davis covers human compatibility genes well, but that he should have gone into more detail on the different systems in other organisms.

The science writer Peter Forbes, writing in The Guardian, notes that when Watson and Crick cracked the genetic code in 1953, it seemed that medicine would instantly profit: but half a century went by before the genome was decoded, and 98% of it seemed at first glance to be junk DNA. Now its complexity is starting to be understood, one function at a time. One specialised area is the immune system, with its own ultra-variable set of proteins. They are not only complicated, but have many functions, in immunity, sexual attraction (perhaps), pregnancy, and brain function. Unsurprisingly, Forbes observes, this makes immunology, and its popularisation, "extremely difficult". Davis "sugars the pill" by choosing to go into the researchers' lives and struggles in great detail. Forbes notes that Davis does not mention that most of the genetic differences between humans and chimpanzees are to do with the immune system and brain development: perhaps (he suggests) these are connected.

Nicola Davis, reviewing the book in The Times, writes that Davis "weaves a warm biographical thread through his tale of scientific discovery, revealing the drive and passion of those in the vanguard of research." The tale of the pioneers such as Medawar is "fairly familiar but Davis's readable narrative allows them to be seen afresh". She finds the account more challenging as it approaches more recent discoveries, but with "plenty of rewarding moments". Emily Banham, reviewing the book for Nature, notes that compatibility genes lie at the heart of our immune systems, playing a part in the success of skin grafts, pregnancy, and more.

The biologist Rebecca Nesbit, reviewing The Compatibility Gene for The Biologist, writes that Davis shares many stories of dedicated scientists, brought together by "a small cluster of 'compatibility genes' which play a large role in how we react to disease, and are central to how our immune systems work." She notes that the book is as much about the people as the discoveries, but these are made worthwhile by the medical advances they keep producing, for example with possibilities for personalised medicine, as when people with one particular compatibility gene react adversely to an AIDS drug. She observes that all the same, he ends with the scientist's favourite refrain: "more research needed".
