= Fay Dowker =

British physicist

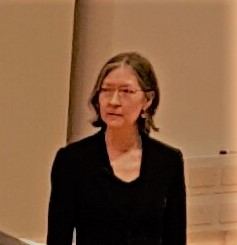
- Born: Helen Fay Dowker; 9 September 1965 (age 60); Manchester, England
- Education: University of Cambridge (BA; PhD 1990)
- Awards: Tyson Medal (1987)
- Scientific career
- Fields: Theoretical physics Causal sets
- Institutions: Imperial College London; Queen Mary University of London; University of California, Santa Barbara; California Institute of Technology; Institute for Quantum Computing; Fermilab; University of Cambridge
- Thesis: Space-time wormholes (1990)
- Doctoral advisor: Stephen Hawking
- Website: imperial.ac.uk/people/f.dowker

Helen Fay Dowker (/ˈdaʊkər/; born 9 September 1965) is a British physicist who is a current professor of theoretical physics at Imperial College London.

== Education ==
Dowker attended Manchester High School for Girls. As a student, she was interested in wormholes and quantum cosmology. Having studied the Mathematical Tripos at the University of Cambridge, Dowker was awarded the Tyson Medal in 1987 and completed her Doctor of Philosophy for research on spacetime wormholes supervised by Stephen Hawking in 1990.

== Career and research ==
Dowker completed postdoctoral research at Fermilab, at the University of California, Santa Barbara and also the California Institute of Technology.

Until 2003, Dowker was a lecturer at Queen Mary University of London.

She is currently a professor of Theoretical Physics and a member of the Theoretical Physics Group at Imperial College London and a Visiting Fellow at the Perimeter Institute. She conducts research in a number of areas of theoretical physics including quantum gravity and causal set theory.

== Personal life ==
Dowker is the daughter of physicist Stuart Dowker, who worked at the University of Manchester. She was interviewed by Jim Al-Khalili for The Life Scientific in 2017.

She delivered the eulogy at Stephen Hawking's funeral, describing him as her "teacher, mentor and friend" and asserting that "his influence and legacy will live forever."
