= Heather Williams (physicist) =

Medical physicist

Heather Williams MBE
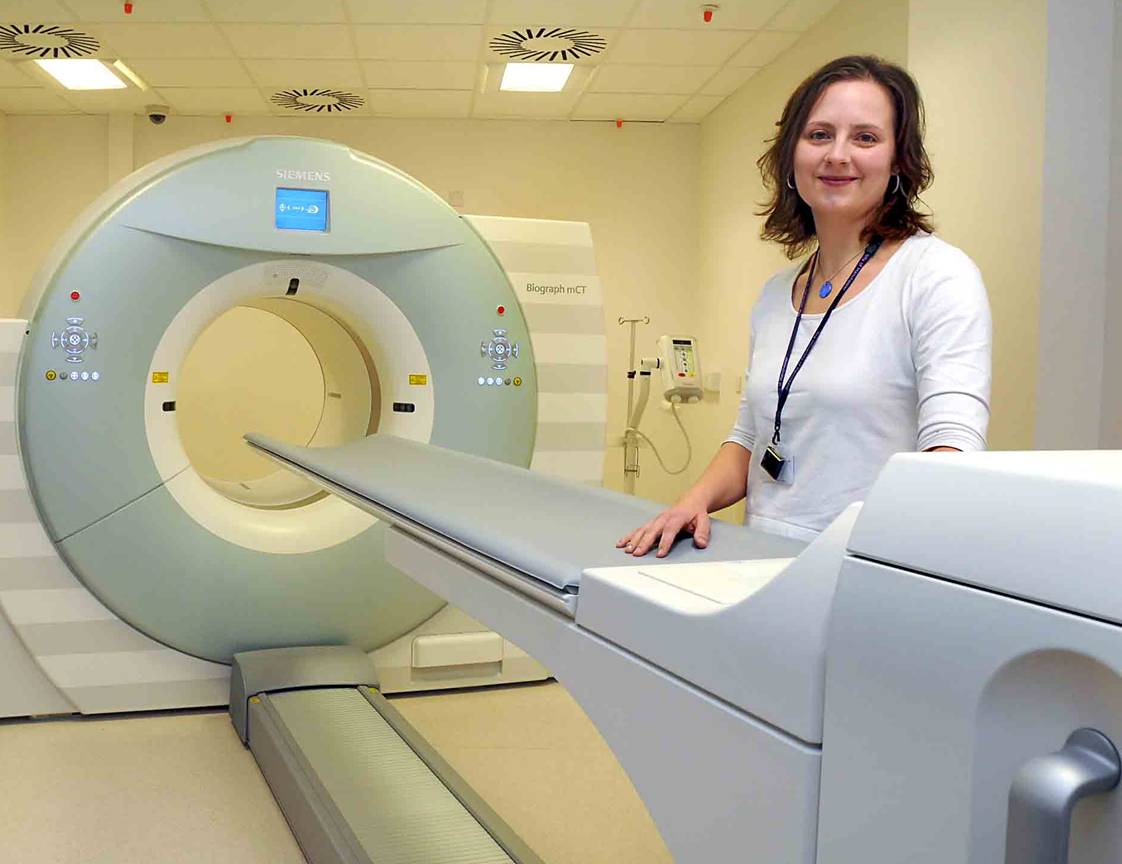
- Heather Williams at work with a PET scanner
- Born: Heather Ann Williams; 1977 (age 48–49); Kingston upon Hull, England, UK
- Education: University of Nottingham; University of Manchester (MSc); University of Manchester Institute of Science and Technology (PhD)
- Awards: IOP Phillips Award (2017)
- Scientific career
- Fields: Medical physics
- Workplaces: University of Manchester; The Christie NHS Foundation Trust
- Thesis: Developing quantitative measures for clinical response assessment using positron emission tomography (2004)
- Doctoral advisor: Jamal Zweit
- Website: twitter.com/alrightpet

Heather Ann Williams MBE (born 1977) is a British medical physicist working as a Consultant Medical Physicist for Nuclear Medicine at The Christie NHS Foundation Trust. She is also a lecturer in the Faculty of Biology, Medicine and Health at University of Manchester, as well as the University of Salford and University of Cumbria.

== Early life and education ==
Heather Williams was born on 20 June 1977 in Kingston upon Hull, and was state-educated in the east of the city. Williams completed a Bachelor of Science degree in Physics with Medical Physics at the University of Nottingham, followed by a Master of Science degree in Physics and Computing with Medicine and Biology at the University of Manchester. During her postgraduate training at Christie Hospital, she completed placements in nuclear medicine, diagnostic radiology, magnetic resonance imaging and radiotherapy. In 2004 was awarded a PhD from the University of Manchester Institute of Science and Technology (UMIST) for developing quantitative measures for clinical response assessment using Positron emission tomography (PET) supervised by Jamal Zweit.

== Research and career ==
Since completing her PhD, Williams has worked for the National Health Service (NHS), first at Central Manchester University Hospitals and currently at The Christie. Her role is to provide scientific support to routine imaging and improve this through research, development and teaching. Her imaging research spans a wide range of topics, including gamma camera and PET performance assessment, quantifying radiotracer uptake, designing methods for clinical research using brain, vascular and cancer imaging, and more unusual projects like imaging mechanisms to remove radioactivity from the environment and tracking breathing motion using the Microsoft Kinect. Williams is a state-registered Clinical Scientist, an honorary lecturer at the University of Manchester and member of the Institute of Physics and Engineering in Medicine (IPEM) and the Institute of Physics (IOP).

=== Policy and public engagement ===
Williams is an advocate for science communication to non-expert audiences. She regularly gives public lectures and contributes to panel discussions at schools, universities, conferences and festivals, and has judged a number of high-profile competitions including The Big Bang Fair North West and STEM for Britain. She has appeared on stage with Alice Roberts, Brian Cox, Dallas Campbell, Helen Czerski, Jim Al-Khalili and Sophie Scott, amongst others. In 2014 she was recognised by the Science Council as one of the top 100 practising scientists in the UK. Williams has been a science demonstrator on the BBC's Bang Goes the Theory, delivered workshops for TeenTech, and is a consultant for the Ogden Trust. She regularly contributes to radio and print media, and has contributed expert testimony to Parliament.

=== Diversity ===
After the European Commission's efforts to encourage girls into science with their video Science: It's a Girl Thing!, Williams recognised that there was a national need for scientists to contribute to the gender imbalance within their disciplines. In 2012 Williams established Science Grrl, a grassroots national network to celebrate and support women in science. Today she acts as one of three directors of the not-for-profit group, overseeing a range of national activities, co-ordinating the website and organising regular events in Manchester. Science Grrl supports nineteen local chapters across the country, who help to match scientists with speaking opportunities close to them. They have inspired several international groups including the French network WAX. In 2014 Science Grrl published Through Both Eyes: the Case for a Gender Lens in STEM. Williams' work with ScienceGrrl was recognised in 2015 when the University of Nottingham made her an alumni laureate. Williams previously served as the Institute of Physics Women in Physics Group Chair, and now represents the Institute of Physics within the European Platform for Women Scientists (EPWS).

=== Awards and honours ===
In 2017 she was awarded the IOP Phillips Award for distinguished service to the IOP through the Women in Physics Group.

In the 2021 New Year Honours Williams was appointed Member of the Order of the British Empire (MBE) for "services to Diversity and to Inclusion in Science".
