= Lloyd Peck =

British physiologist

Lloyd Peck FRS is a British physiologist who is a scientist with the British Antarctic Survey and affiliated with the Wolfson College, Cambridge. He is known for his research into biological adaptations of animals to extreme cold, in particular sea spiders.

He presented the 2004 Royal Institution Christmas Lectures on surviving in the Antarctic. In 2024 he was elected a Fellow of the Royal Society.
