= Teresa Anderson =

British physicist

Teresa Anderson MBE
- Born: Teresa Mary Anderson; December 1962 (age 63)
- Education: University of Manchester; University of Edinburgh (PhD)
- Known for: Jodrell Bank Discovery Centre; Blue dot festival
- Awards: Kelvin Prize (2014)
- Scientific career
- Institutions: University of Manchester
- Thesis: MICADO a system of decision support software for micro hydro power in Nepal (1992)
- Doctoral advisor: Bert Whittington; Ewen Macpherson

Teresa Mary Anderson MBE (born 1962) is a British physicist and the director of the University of Manchester's Discovery Centre at Jodrell Bank Observatory. She is a professor at the University of Manchester and the curator of science at the Bluedot Festival.

== Education ==
Anderson completed an undergraduate degree in the School of Physics at the University of Manchester in 1986. She earned a Masters in Instrumentation and Analytical Science. She received a PhD in Electrical Engineering from the University of Edinburgh where her thesis was on developing renewable energy systems in Nepal. She also holds a Master's degree in Fine Art from the Birmingham Institute of Art and Design.

== Career ==
After graduating she went on to work for Practical Action, a charity which uses technology to challenge poverty in developing countries. Anderson worked in the Himalayas, Sri Lanka and the South American rainforest. She returned to the UK to work with the Science Policy Research Unit and the University of Warwick on Renewable Energy and Climate Change Policy. Anderson spent three years creating the UK Café Scientifique network with Duncan Dallas and Tom Shakespeare, which has now established a significant national and international reputation. She then joined NESTA to work on Science-Culture-Arts policy.

=== Jodrell Bank ===
In 2006, Anderson joined Jodrell Bank Observatory. In 2010 she began to set up the Discovery Centre, which opened in 2011. Today Anderson is Director of the Discovery Centre at Jodrell Bank Observatory which welcomes over 185,000 visitors per year. The Jodrell Bank schools programme started in 2012 and sees 26,000 school children visit per year. The Centre is run as a Social enterprise and receives very little funding.

The centre run Live from Jodrell Bank science-music events, including bands such as The Flaming Lips, New Order and Elbow alongside scientific research such as graphene and the Large Hadron Collider. The Centre has won many awards, including Marketing Cheshire's Team of the Year and the UK Festival Awards Extreme Creativity award. In 2015 Anderson secured £12 million of Heritage Lottery Fund support to develop the Grade I listed site. In 2016, Anderson launched Bluedot, a festival of discovery based at Jodrell Bank Observatory. Practical Action are one of the Bluedot Festival's charity partners. She was awarded an honorary Professorship at the University of Manchester. In 2017, Anderson and the Jodrell Bank Observatory Discovery Centre were awarded £4 million in the Autumn Statement. After many years of work by Anderson and Professor Tim O'Brien, the site, home to the Lovell Telescope, was selected as the UK's 2019 nomination for UNESCO World Heritage Site.

=== Awards and honours ===
Anderson was recognised for her services to Astrophysics in 2013, when the Queen awarded her an MBE. She won the 2014 Institute of Physics Kelvin Prize for Public Engagement with physics, alongside Tim O'Brien. Anderson was Chair of the Association of Science and Discovery Centres in 2010, a role she held until 2015. Anderson is on the Advisory Panel for the Science and Technology Facilities Council Public Engagement strategy. She is a Fellow of the Royal Astronomical Society.

In 2015 Anderson became Chair of the Daphne Jackson Trust, a charity which supports scientists in their return-to-work following career breaks.
