= Sarah Bridle =

British astrophysicist

- Born: Sarah Louise Bridle
- Education: University of Cambridge (BA, MSci, PhD)
- Spouse: Keith Grainge
- Awards: Royal Society University Research Fellow (2003)
- Scientific career
- Fields: Astrophysics; Dark energy; Weak gravitational lensing
- Workplaces: University of York; University of Manchester; University College London; Cavendish Laboratory; Observatoire Midi-Pyrénées; University of Cambridge
- Thesis: Bayesian methods in cosmology (2001)
- Doctoral advisor: Mike Hobson
- Website: sarahbridle.net

Sarah Louise Bridle is a Professor of Food, Climate and Society at the University of York. She previously served as Professor of extragalactic astronomy and cosmology in the Department of Physics and Astronomy, University of Manchester where she applied statistical techniques to the cosmic microwave background (CMB) and on the use of weak gravitational lensing in cosmology. From 2006 - 2015 she co-led weak lensing efforts with the Dark Energy Survey (DES), was co-lead of the Euclid weak lensing working group and was Large Synoptic Survey Telescope (LSST) UK Project Scientist from 2013 to 2017.

Bridle is a patron of Humanists UK.

== Education ==
Bridle was brought up in Gloucestershire where her father was involved with computers and artificial intelligence (AI). She was educated at the University of Cambridge and was awarded several prizes and then a first class Master of Arts degree in Natural Sciences in 1997. Bridle then started doctoral research about dark matter, which was one of the popular areas in cosmology in the mid-1990s. She was awarded a PhD in 2000 on Bayesian methods in cosmology supervised by Mike Hobson.

== Career and research ==
Bridle's research investigates climate change, focusing on a quantitative approach to helping transform food systems. Previously her research investigated the nature of the dark energy which may be the cause of the accelerating universe. She uses weak gravitational lensing to investigate dark energy because it can reveal the distribution of dark matter.

Her research has been funded by the Science and Technology Facilities Council (STFC), the Royal Society and the European Research Council (ERC).

Following her PhD, Bridle was a postdoctoral researcher at the Laboratoire d'Astrophysique of the Observatoire Midi-Pyrénées (OMP) in Toulouse and Selwyn College, Cambridge. In 2004, Bridle was appointed a lecturer at University College London and was subsequently promoted to Reader in 2008 and professor at the University of Manchester in 2013.

In 2015, in part inspired by the illness of David J. C. MacKay, Bridle adopted a new research direction about agriculture, food and sustainability on the planet Earth, making use of data as in her astrophysical research. She leads the greenhouse gas and dietary choices open-source toolkit (GGDOT)

Bridle has supervised several PhD students.

=== Awards and honours ===
In 2003 Bridle was awarded a Royal Society University Research Fellowship (URF) for early career scientists which she held until 2012.

In 2008, Bridle received a L'Oréal UK and Ireland Fellowship for Women in Science. A recipient of the Royal Astronomical Society's 2009 Fowler Award, Bridle was nominated one of the "Top 10 UK Scientists under 40" by the Times Eureka Magazine in 2010.
