= The Life Scientific =

BBC Radio 4 science biography programme

- Running time: 28 minutes
- Home station: BBC Radio 4
- Hosted by: Jim Al-Khalili
- Written by: Jim Al-Khalili
- Original release: 11 October 2011
- No. of episodes: 366 (as of 10 November 2026)
- Website: The Life Scientific at BBC Online

The Life Scientific is a BBC Radio 4 science programme, presented by Jim Al-Khalili, in which each episode is dedicated to the biography and work of a living scientist. The programme consists of an interview between Al-Khalili and the featured scientist, with others contributing anecdotes.

It is broadcast on Tuesday mornings in the UK, and is available online and via BBC Sounds, as is an archive of past episodes. In October 2021 the programme reached its 10-year anniversary with discussion between Ottoline Leyser, Paul Nurse, Christopher Jackson and Sue Black on the topic of 'What makes a scientist?'.

== Episodes ==
Guests have included:

Number	Guest	Air Date	Topic	Episode page
1	Paul Nurse	11 October 2011	Biology, winning the Nobel Prize and being President of the Royal Society	
2	Steven Pinker	18 October 2011	Science writing and cognitive psychology	
3	Jocelyn Bell Burnell	25 October 2011	Astrophysics and not winning the Nobel Prize	
4	Michael Marmot	1 November 2011	How stress kills	
5	Colin Blakemore	8 November 2011	Neuroscience	
6	Molly Stevens	15 November 2011	Growing human bones in a test tube	
7	Nicola Clayton	22 November 2011	The intelligence of birds	
8	John Sulston	29 November 2011	Biology	
9	Uta Frith	6 December 2011	Changing how we view brain disorders	
10	Tim Hunt	13 December 2011	Molecular biology and winning the Nobel Prize	
11	Robert Winston	20 December 2011	IVF, the House of Lords, and scientists' ethical responsibility	
12	Colin Pillinger	27 December 2011	Life on Mars	
13	Robin Murray	7 February 2012	The cause of schizophrenia	
14	Chris Stringer	14 February 2012	Paleoanthropology and who our ancestors were	
15	Tony Ryan	21 February 2012	The future of nanotechnology	
16	Iain Chalmers	28 February 2012	Health services	
17	Martin Rees	6 March 2012	The multiverse	
18	John Lawton	13 March 2012	Ecology	
19	Tejinder Virdee	20 March 2012	The search for the Higgs boson	
20	Angela Gallop	27 March 2012	Forensic science	
21	James Lovelock	8 May 2012	The Gaia hypothesis, microwave ovens	
22	Frances Ashcroft	15 May 2012	The link between blood sugar and insulin	
23	Lloyd Peck	22 May 2012	Giant sea spiders	
24	Barbara Sahakian	29 May 2012	Neurotransmitters	
25	Bob May	5 June 2012	Public trust	
26	John Pickett	12 June 2012	GM wheat	
27	Steve Jones	7 August 2012	Snail studies	
28	Pat Wolseley	14 August 2012	Her obsession with lichen	
29	Martin Siegert	21 August 2012	Under the Antarctic ice	
30	Ann Dowling	28 August 2012	Silent aircraft	
31	Richard Dawkins	4 September 2012	Being a biologist and author	
32	Andrea Sella	11 September 2012	Why my chemistry demonstrations are filling theatres	
33	David Nutt	18 September 2012	Research into drugs and the brain	
34	Sunetra Gupta	25 September 2012	Being a scientist and novelist	
35	Mark Walport	2 October 2012	Being Government Chief Scientific Advisor	
36	Hugh Montgomery	9 October 2012	The gene for fitness	
37	Monica Grady	16 October 2012	Life on Mars	
38	Jared Diamond	4 December 2012	Gall bladders, global history, and the birds of Papua New Guinea	
39	John Gurdon	18 December 2012	Cloning a frog decades before Dolly the Sheep	
40	Amoret Whitaker	8 January 2013	Insects and their role in helping solve crimes	
41	Robert Mair	15 January 2013	Tunnelling under Big Ben, Crossrail, and engineering for the future	
42	Annette Karmiloff-Smith	22 January 2013	Should babies under two watch TV?	
43	Noel Sharkey	29 January 2013	Robotics and psychology	
44	Valerie Beral	5 February 2013	Breast cancer	
45	Alan Watson	19 February 2013	His quest to discover the source of cosmic rays	
46	Sue Ion	26 February 2013	Working in the nuclear industry	
47	Nancy Rothwell	7 May 2013	Neuroscience	
48	Sanjeev Gupta	14 May 2013	What links the English Channel to valleys on Mars?	
49	John Krebs	21 May 2013	Birds, foot-and-mouth disease and badgers	
50	Linda Partridge	28 May 2013	The science of longevity	
51	Athene Donald	4 June 2013	The physics behind everyday stuff	
52	Ewan Birney	11 June 2013	Deciphering the human genome and junk DNA	
53	David Spiegelhalter	18 June 2013	Risk and uncertainty	
54	Elizabeth Stokoe	25 June 2013	Studying real-life conversations	
55	Russell Foster	20 August 2013	Circadian rhythms and jet lag	
56	Joanna Haigh	27 August 2013	Climate	
57	Mark Lythgoe	3 September 2013	Medical imaging and mountain climbing	
58	Michael Benton	10 September 2013	Digging up dinosaurs in remote places	
59	Ian Stewart	17 September 2013	Sci-fi and popularising maths	
60	Sophie Scott	24 September 2013	The science of laughter	
61	Jenny Graves	1 October 2013	Kangaroos and the death of the Y chromosome	
62	Wendy Hall	8 October 2013	The development of the web	
63	Peter Higgs	18 February 2014	The real story of the Higgs boson	
64	Sue Black	25 February 2014	Identifying human bodies	
65	Vikram Patel	4 March 2014	Global mental health	
66	Mark Miodownik	11 March 2014	Nuclear weapons, 3D printers and smart materials	
67	Anne Glover	18 March 2014	Glow-in-the-dark bacteria and advising ministers	
68	Alf Adams	25 March 2014	His small idea that changed the world	
69	Veronica van Heyningen	1 April 2014	The gene that builds the eye	
70	Julia Slingo	8 April 2014	Being chief scientist at the Met Office	
71	Michael Rutter	3 June 2014	Child psychiatry	
72	Janet Hemingway	10 June 2014	Malaria and the coming of insecticide resistance	
73	Chris Lintott	17 June 2014	Crowd sourced astronomy and Galaxy Zoo	
74	Sandra Knapp	24 June 2014	Her adventures collecting plants in South America	
75	Christopher Llewellyn Smith	1 July 2014	Nuclear fusion, quarks, bosons and running the biggest experiments in history	
76	Zoe Shipton	8 July 2014	Earthquakes and Fracking	
77	Jeremy Farrar	15 July 2014	Fighting viruses	
78	Carol Robinson	22 July 2014	Chemistry	
79	Brian Cox	23 September 2014	Quantum mechanics	
80	Jackie Akhavan	30 September 2014	Explosives	
81	Elspeth Garman	7 October 2014	Crystallography	
82	Chris Toumazou	14 October 2014	Inventing medical devices	
83	Margaret Boden	21 October 2014	Artificial intelligence	
84	Richard Fortey	28 October 2014	Fossils	
85	Sally Davies	4 November 2014	Public health	
86	Dave Goulson	11 November 2014	Bees	
87	John O'Keefe	10 March 2015	Memory	
88	Matt Taylor	17 March 2015	The Rosetta space mission	
89	Sarah-Jayne Blakemore	24 March 2015	Teenage brains	
90	Jane Francis	31 March 2015	Antarctica	
91	Stephanie Shirley	7 April 2015	Computer coding	
92	Nigel Shadbolt	14 April 2015	The worldwide web	
93	Susan Jebb	21 April 2015	Nutrition	
94	Anil Seth	16 June 2015	Consciousness	
95	Kate Jones	23 June 2015	Bats and biodiversity	
96	Henry Marsh	30 June 2015	Brain surgery	
97	Dorothy Bishop	7 July 2015	Language disorders	
98	Carlos Frenk	14 July 2015	Dark matter	
99	Niamh Nic Daéid	21 July 2015	Forensic science	
100	E. O. Wilson	28 July 2015	Ants and evolution	
101	Geoff Palmer	4 August 2015	Brewing	
102	Carol Black	6 October 2015	Public health	
103	Danielle George	13 October 2015	Electronics	
104	Robert Plomin	20 October 2015	The genetics of intelligence	
105	Patrick Vallance	3 November 2015	Pharmaceuticals	
106	Kathy Willis	10 November 2015	Botany	
107	Paul Younger	17 November 2015	Energy for the future	
108	Peter Piot	9 February 2016	Tackling ebola and HIV	
109	Naomi Climer	16 February 2016	Engineering	
110	Nick Lane	23 February 2016	The origin of life on earth	
111	George Davey Smith	1 March 2016	Health inequalities	
112	Venki Ramakrishnan	8 March 2016	Ribosomes	
113	Helen Sharman	15 March 2016	Being an astronaut	
114	Carolyn Roberts	22 March 2016	Flood control	
115	Lawrence Krauss	31 May 2016	Dark energy	
116	Marcus du Sautoy	7 June 2016	Mathematics	
117	Sheila Rowan	14 June 2016	Gravitational waves	
118	Nick Davies	21 June 2016	Cuckoos	
119	Hazel Rymer	28 June 2016	Volcanoes	
120	Faraneh Vargha-Khadem	5 July 2016	Memory	
121	Georgina Mace	12 July 2016	Threatened species	
122	Trevor Cox	19 July 2016	Sound	
123	Ian Wilmut	4 October 2016	Dolly the Sheep	
124	Frans de Waal	11 October 2016	Chimpanzees	
125	Lynne Boddy	15 November 2016	Fungi	
126	Roger Penrose	22 November 2016	Black holes, quantum mechanics, consciousness	
127	Julia Higgins	29 November 2016	Polymers	
128	Richard Morris	6 December 2016	How we know where we are	
129	Neil deGrasse Tyson	20 December 2016	Pluto	
130	Michele Dougherty	10 January 2017	Saturn	
131	Jan Zalasiewicz	17 January 2017	The Age of Man	
132	Sadaf Farooqi	24 January 2017	What makes us fat	
133	Alison Smith	31 January 2017	Algae	
134	Sean Carroll	7 February 2017	How time and space began	
135	Simon Wessely	14 February 2017	Unexplained medical syndromes	
136	Alan Winfield	21 February 2017	Robot ethics	
137	Alison Woollard	28 February 2017	What she has learnt from mutant worms	
138	Daniel Dennett	4 April 2017	The evolution of the human brain	
139	Nick Fraser	11 April 2017	Triassic reptiles	
140	Liz Sockett	18 April 2017	Friendly killer bacteria	
141	Graham MacGregor	25 April 2017	Tackling the demons in our diet	
142	Ann Clarke	2 May 2017	The Frozen Ark	
143	Fay Dowker	9 May 2017	A new theory of space-time	
144	Ottoline Leyser	16 May 2017	How plants decide what to do	
145	Tim O'Brien	23 May 2017	Transient stars and science and music festivals	
146	Tamsin Mather	30 May 2017	Volcanology	
147	Jennifer Doudna	19 September 2017	Gene editing	
148	Tracey Rogers	26 September 2017	Leopard seals and Antarctica	
149	Lucie Green	3 October 2017	The Sun	
150	Steven Cowley	10 October 2017	Nuclear Fusion	
151	Tim Birkhead	17 October 2017	Bird promiscuity	
152	Ellen Stofan	24 October 2017	Being NASA Chief Scientist	
153	Adrian Thomas	31 October 2017	The mechanics of flight	
154	Eben Upton	16 January 2018	Raspberry Pi	
155	Eugenia Cheng	23 January 2018	The mathematics of mathematics	
156	Wendy Barclay	30 January 2018	The flu virus	
157	Richard Henderson	13 February 2018	The molecules of life	
158	John Burn	20 February 2018	The genetics of cancer	
159	Ailie MacAdam	27 February 2018	The biggest construction project in Europe	
160	Clare Grey	6 March 2018	Big battery challenge	
161	Steve Reicher	13 March 2018	Psychology of crowds	
162	Callum Roberts	1 May 2018	Marine conservation	
163	Carlo Rovelli	8 May 2018	Why time is not what it seems	
164	Caroline Dean	15 May 2018	Genetic secrets of flowering	
165	Catherine Hobaiter	22 May 2018	Communication in apes	
166	John Taylor	29 May 2018	Being an inventor	
167	Sheena Cruickshank	5 June 2018	The wonders of the human immune system	
168	Frank Close	12 June 2018	Particle physics	
169	Rachel Mills	19 June 2018	Exploring the sea floor	
170	Jacqueline McGlade	23 October 2018	Monitoring the environment from space	
171	Noel Fitzpatrick	30 October 2018	Becoming a supervet	
172	Suzanne O'Sullivan	6 November 2018	Detective of the mind	
173	Michael Stratton	13 November 2018	Cancer genes	
174	Caroline Hargrove	20 November 2018	Formula One	
175	Alastair Hay	27 November 2018	Banning chemical weapons	
176	Maggie Aderin-Pocock	4 December 2018	Sky at Night presenter	
177	Clive Oppenheimer	11 December 2018	Volcanic offerings of our angry earth	
178	Jim Al-Khalili	5 February 2019	HIS life scientific: Interviewed by Adam Rutherford	
179	Sue Black	12 February 2019	Women in Technology	
180	Gregory Winter	19 February 2019	2018 Nobel Prize in Chemistry winner	
181	Gwen Adshead	26 February 2019	The minds of violent offenders	
182	Donna Strickland	5 March 2019	Laser physics	
183	Ken Gabriel	12 March 2019	Why your Smartphone is Smart	
184	Corinne Le Quéré	19 March 2019	Global carbon cycle	
185	Paul Davies	26 March 2019	Origin of life and the evolution of cancer	
186	Irene Tracey	2 April 2019	Pain in the brain	
187	Richard Peto	9 April 2019	Why smoking kills but quitting saves lives	
188	Erica McAlister	16 April 2019	The beauty of flies	
189	Richard Thompson	25 June 2019	Plastic pollution	
190	Ewine van Dishoeck	2 July 2019	Cosmic chemistry	
191	Turi King	9 July 2019	Ancient DNA	
192	Katherine Joy	16 July 2019	Lunar rock	
193	Robin Dunbar	23 July 2019	Why we have friends	
194	Jonathan Ball	30 July 2019	Arms race against viruses	
195	Richard Wiseman	1 October 2019	Lying, luck and the paranormal	
196	Anne Magurran	8 October 2019	How to measure biodiversity	
197	Martha Clokie	15 October 2019	The viruses that could improve our health	
198	Adrian Owen	22 October 2019	Scanning for awareness in the injured brain	
199	Saiful Islam	29 October 2019	Materials to power the 21st century	
200	Demis Hassabis	5 November 2019	Artificial intelligence	
201	Elizabeth Fisher	12 November 2019	Chromosomes in mice and men	
202	Patricia Wiltshire	7 January 2020	How pollen can solve crimes	
203	Susannah Maidment	14 January 2020	Stegosaurs	
204	Peter Fonagy	28 January 2020	A revolution in mental health care	
205	Peter Ratcliffe	4 February 2020	2019 Nobel Prize winner for Physiology or Medicine	
206	Polina Bayvel	11 February 2020	Optical communications	
207	Myles Allen	18 February 2020	Understanding climate change	
208	Anya Hurlbert	25 February 2020	Seeing colour	
209	Matthew Cobb	3 March 2020	How we detect smells	
210	Brian Greene	28 April 2020	How the universe is made of string	
211	Jim McDonald	5 May 2020	Power networks	
212	Debbie Pain	12 May 2020	Conserving globally threatened bird species	
213	Frank Kelly	19 May 2020	Air pollution	
214	Liz Seward	26 May 2020	The dream of spaceflight	
215	Jane Goodall	2 June 2020	Living with wild chimpanzees	
216	Emma Bunce	9 June 2020	The gas giants	
217	Clifford Stott	16 June 2020	Riot prevention	
218	Alice Roberts	4 August 2020	Bones	
219	Andy Fabian	11 August 2020	Black holes	
220	Dale Sanders	18 August 2020	Feeding the world	
221	Heather Koldewey	25 August 2020	Marine conservation	
222	Francesca Happé	1 September 2020	Autism	
223	Steve Haake	8 September 2020	Technology, sport and health	
224	Sarah Gilbert	15 September 2020	Developing a vaccine for Covid-19	
225	Neil Ferguson	22 September 2020	Modelling Covid-19	
226	Jim Al-Khalili	15 December 2020	Scientists in the Spotlight during the Pandemic	
227	Chris Jackson	12 January 2021	Sustainable geology	
228	Catherine Noakes	19 January 2021	Making buildings Covid-safe	
229	Giles Yeo	26 January 2021	How our genes can make us fat	
230	Anne Johnson	2 February 2021	The importance of public health	
231	Jane Hurst	16 February 2021	The secret life of mice	
232	Richard Bentall	23 February 2021	The causes of mental ill health	
233	Sarah Bridle	2 March 2021	The carbon footprint of food	
234	Mark Spencer	9 March 2021	How plants solve crimes	
235	Theresa Marteau	13 April 2021	How to change behaviour	
236	Martin Sweeting	20 April 2021	Inventor of microsatellites	
237	Jane Clarke	27 April 2021	Protein folding	
238	Peter Goadsby	4 May 2021	Migraine	
239	Helen Scales	11 May 2021	Marine conservation	
240	Nira Chamberlain	18 May 2021	How mathematics can solve real-world problems	
241	Mike Tipton	25 May 2021	How our bodies respond to extreme conditions	
242	Tamsin Edwards	1 June 2021	Uncertainty in climate science	
243	Hannah Fry	7 September 2021	The power and perils of big data	
244	David Eagleman	14 September 2021	Why reality is an illusion	
245	Brenda Boardman	21 September 2021	Making our homes energy efficient	
246	Derk-Jan Dijk	28 September 2021	The importance of sleep	
247	Hannah Cloke	5 October 2021	Predicting floods	
248	Jim Al-Khalili	12 October 2021	The Life Scientific at 10: What makes a scientist? Talking with Ottoline Leyser, Paul Nurse, Christopher Jackson and Sue Black	
249	Patrick Vallance	12 October 2021	Science and our future	
250	Tim Spector	19 October 2021	Personalised diets for long term health	
251	Tim Clutton-Brock	23 October 2021	Meerkats, red deer and evolution	
252	Sharon Peacock	2 November 2021	Hunting pandemic variants of concern	
253	Julia Shaw	22 February 2022	Memories that aren't true	
254	Shankar Balasubramanian	1 March 2022	Decoding DNA	
255	Stephen L. Brusatte	8 March 2022	The fall of dinosaurs and the rise of mammals	
256	Ben Garrod	22 March 2022	Wildlife conservation and extinction	
257	Chi Onwurah	24 May 2022	Why engineering is a caring profession	
258	Pete Smith	31 May 2022	Why soil matters	
259	Jacinta Tan	7 June 2022	Anorexia nervosa and the mind	
260	Adam Hart	14 June 2022	Ants, bees and insect burgers	
261	Vlatko Vedral	21 June 2022	The universe as quantum information	
262	Martin Landray	28 June 2022	Saving over a million lives	
263	Frances Arnold	6 September 2022	From taxi driver to Nobel Prize	
264	Judith Bunbury	13 September 2022	The shifting River Nile in the time of the Pharaohs	
265	Emily A. Holmes	20 September 2022	How to treat trauma	
266	Daphne Koller	27 September 2022	Can computers discover new medicines?	
267	Tim Lamont	4 October 2022	The sounds of coral reefs	
268	Leon Barron	11 October 2022	Why study sewage?	
269	Bambos Kyriacou	18 October 2022	A passion for fruit flies	
270	Chris Elliott	10 January 2023	Fighting food fraud	
271	Pamela Shaw	17 January 2023	Research battle against motor neurone disease	
272	Rebecca Kilner	24 January 2023	Beetle behaviours and evolution	
273	Clifford V. Johnson	31 January 2023	Making sense of black holes and movie plots	
274	Adrian Smith	7 February 2023	The power of Bayesian statistics	
275	Haley Gomez	21 February 2023	Cosmic dust	
276	Danny Altmann	28 February 2023	How T cells fight disease	
277	Julia King	7 March 2023	Manipulating metals and decarbonising transport	
278	Marie Johnston	14 March 2023	Health psychology and the power of behavioural shifts	
279	James Jackson	21 March 2023	Understanding earthquakes and building resilience	
280	Julie Williams	28 March 2023	Alzheimer's disease	
281	Andre Geim	23 May 2023	Levitating frogs, graphene and 2D materials	
282	Gillian Reid	30 May 2023	Making chemistry count	
283	Bruce Malamud	6 June 2023	Modelling risk for natural hazards	
284	Anne-Marie Imafidon	13 June 2023	Fighting for diversity and equality in science	
285	Anne Ferguson-Smith	20 June 2023	Unravelling epigenetics	
286	Harold Haas	27 June 2023	Making waves in light communication	
287	Deborah Greaves	8 August 2023	Wave power and offshore renewable energy	
288	Gideon Henderson	16 August 2023	Climate 'clocks' and dating ice ages	
289	Chris Barratt	23 August 2023	Head-banging sperm and a future male contraceptive pill	
290	Colin Humphreys	29 August 2023	Electron microscopes, and the thinnest material in the world	
291	Bahija Jallal	5 September 2023	Biotech revolution in cancer therapies	
292	Paul Murdin	12 September 2023	The first ever identification of a black hole	
293	Alexandre Antonelli	19 September 2023	Learning from nature's biodiversity to adapt to climate change	
294	Edward Witten	31 October 2023	M-Theory, the leading contender for a 'the theory of everything'	
295	Sarah Blaffer Hrdy	7 November 2023	Human evolution and parenthood	
296	Sarah Harper	14 November 2023	How population change is remodelling societies	
297	Michael Berry	21 November 2023	Phenomena in physics' borderlands	
298	Cathie Sudlow	28 November 2023	Data in healthcare	
299	Harshad Bhadeshia	5 December 2023	Choreography of metals	
300	Mercedes Maroto-Valer	12 December 2023	Making carbon dioxide useful	
301	Michael Wooldridge	19 December 2023	AI and sentient robots	
302	Jonathan Van-Tam	12 March 2024	Covid communication and the power of football analogies	
303	Charles Godfray	19 March 2024	Parasitic wasps and the race to feed nine billion people	
304	Sheila Willis	26 March 2024	Using science to help solve crime	
305	Nick Longrich	2 April 2024	Discovering new dinosaurs from overlooked bones	
306	Fiona Rayment	9 April 2024	Applications of nuclear for net zero and beyond	
307	Hannah Critchlow	16 April 2024	The connected brain	
308	Mike Edmunds	23 April 2024	The chemical make-up of galaxies and decoding the Antikythera Mechanism	
309	Conny Aerts	24 June 2024	Star vibrations and following your dreams	
310	Anne Child	2 July 2024	Marfan syndrome and love at first sight	
311	Janet Treasure	9 July 2024	Eating disorders and the quest for answers	
312	Raymond Schinazi	16 July 2024	Revolutionising treatments for killer viruses	
313	Dawn Bonfield	23 July 2024	Inclusive engineering, sustainable solutions, and why she once tried to leave the sector for good	
314	Vicky Tolfrey	30 July 2024	Parasport research and childhood dreams of the Olympics	
315	Kip Thorne	6 August 2024	Black holes, Nobel Prizes, and taking physics to Hollywood	
316	Bill Gates	20 August 2024	Vaccines, conspiracy theories, and the pleasures of pickleball	
317	Darren Croft	27 August 2024	Killer whale matriarchs and the menopause	
318	Ijeoma Uchegbu	4 September 2024	Using nanoparticles to transform medicines	
319	Peter Stott	10 September 2024	Climate change deniers and Italian inspiration	
320	Rosalie David	17 September 2024	The science of Egyptian mummies	
321	Anna Korre	24 September 2024	Capturing carbon dioxide and defying expectations	
322	Tim Peake	31 December 2024	His journey to becoming an astronaut and science in space	
323	Magdi Yacoub	18 February 2025	Pioneering heart transplant surgery	
324	Tori Herridge	25 February 2025	Ancient dwarf elephants and frozen mammoths	
325	Doyne Farmer	4 March 2025	Making sense of chaos for a better world	
326	Jonathan Shepherd	11 March 2025	A career as a crime-fighting surgeon	
327	Jacqueline McKinley	18 March 2025	Unearthing bones and stories at Britain's ancient burial sites	
328	Brian Schmidt	25 March 2025	Nobel Prize-winning supernovae and the joys of making wine	
329	Anthony Fauci	29 April 2025	A medical career navigating pandemics and presidents	
330	Liz Morris	6 May 2025	Antarctic adventures and the melting polar ice sheets	
331	Neil Lawrence	13 May 2025	Taking down the 'digital oligarchy' and why we shouldn't fear AI	
332	Claudia de Rham	20 May 2025	Playing with gravity	
333	Timothy Coulson	27 May 2025	How predators shape ecosystems and evolution	
334	Catherine Heymans	4 June 2025	The lighter side of the dark universe	
335	Pratibha Gai	11 June 2025	Training atoms to do what we want	
336	Kevin Fong	18 June 2025	Medical planning for Mars and Earth-based emergencies	
337	Mark O'Shea	9 September 2025	Close encounters with venomous snakes	
338	Sonia Gandhi	16 September 2025	Building model brains to tackle Parkinson's disease	
339	Gareth Collett	23 September 2025	A career in bomb disposal	
340	George Church	30 September 2025	Reimagining woolly mammoths and virus-proofing humans	
341	Eleanor Schofield	7 October 2025	Conserving Tudor warship the Mary Rose	
342	Peter Knight	14 October 2025	Quantum technologies	
343	AP De Silva	21 October 2025	Building molecular fluorescence sensors for healthcare	
344	Caroline Smith	28 October 2025	Meteorites and potential ancient life on Mars	
345	Julia Simner	4 November 2025	Tasty words and hearing colours	
346	Pierre Friedlingstein	11 November 2025	Carbon’s pivotal role in climate change	
347	Tony Juniper	23 December 2025	Parrots, princes and environmental protection	
348	Jehane Ragai	30 December 2025	The science of authenticating artworks	
349	Jim Ashworth-Beaumont	10 March 2026	How a near-fatal accident made him a better clinician	
350	Jens Juul Holst	17 March 2026	The gut hormone discovery behind weight-loss drugs	
351	Lucy Carpenter	24 March 2026	How our oceans are destroying ozone	
352	Washington Yotto Ochieng	31 March 2026	The navigation tech that keeps our world moving	
353	Hiranya Peiris	7 April 2026	Unravelling the story of the universe	
354	Seth Berkley	14 April 2026	The importance of vaccinating the world	
355	Helen Hastie	21 April 2026	The future of human-robot relations	
356	Dean Lomax	28 April 2026	Discovering ichthyosaurs and defying nay-sayers	
357	Ginger Kerrick	8 September 2026	Manning Nasa's Mission Control and getting to Mars	
358	Edith Heard	15 September 2026	Unravelling the mystery of X-chromosome inactivation	
359	David Canter	22 September 2026	How psychology can save lives and catch killers	
360	Gillian Forrester	29 September 2026	Gesturing gorillas, babbling babies and the origins of human language	
361	Robert Ballard	6 October 2026	Finding the Titanic and other deep-sea discoveries	
362	Asel Sartbaeva	13 October 2026	Protecting vaccines with a pinch of sand	
363	Tom Hart	20 October 2026	Antarctic wildlife and the power of penguin poo	
364	Adrian Crellin	27 October 2026	Pioneering smarter radiotherapy for treating cancer	
365	Elham Kashefi	3 November 2026	How will quantum computing change the world?	
366	Chris Packham	10 November 2026	Kestrels, conservation and how science can save the world	
