= Tolfrey =

Tolfrey is a surname. Notable people with the surname include:

- Matt Tolfrey (1980–2025), English DJ, producer, and label owner
- Samuel Tolfrey (died 1827), British civil servant British Ceylon (now Sri Lanka)
- Vicky Tolfrey (fl. 1994), English sports scientist
- William Tolfrey (1778–1817), British civil servant in Ceylon (now Sri Lanka)
