= Lynne Boddy =

British mycologist

Lynne Boddy MBE FRSB FLSW
- Education: University of Exeter (BSc, DSc); Queen Mary College (PhD)
- Known for: Mycology
- Awards: Marsh Ecology Award (2016)
- Scientific career
- Workplaces: University of Bath; Cardiff University
- Thesis: Decomposition ecology of fallen branch-wood (1980)
- Website: www.cardiff.ac.uk/people/view/81120-boddy-lynne

Lynne Boddy MBE FRSB FLSW is a Professor of Microbial Ecology at Cardiff University. She works on the ecology of wood decomposition, including synecology and autecology. She won the 2018 Learned Society of Wales Frances Hoggan Medal.

== Early life and education ==
Boddy studied biology at the University of Exeter. She became interested in mycology because she was taught by the notable mycologist John Webster and encountered the fungus Serpula lacrimans causing dry rot in her student accommodation. She joined Queen Mary College as a research assistant working on the decay of wood. Here she was the local organiser of a symposium on decomposer basidiomycetes. She earned a PhD in ecology from Queen Mary University of London and a Doctor of Science DSc degree in the ecology of wood composition from the University of Exeter. She worked under the supervision of Mike Swift.

== Research and career ==
Boddy was appointed a postdoctoral researcher at the University of Bath. Boddy subsequently joined Cardiff University in 1983, where she worked on antagonistic interactions, mycelia and fungal communities. Fungal communities impact the decay rate of wood. She studied how neural networks could be used to analyse flow cytometry data from phytoplankton. She is interested in how fungi fight with each other as they investigate the forest floor. Boddy identified that fungi battle each other by producing inhibitory chemicals that can be transmitted through the air, equivalent to the poisonous gas produced during World War I. Her research on fighting fungi was featured in New Scientist.

Boddy leads the Fungal Ecology Group at Cardiff University. She looked at the decomposition of coarse woody debris. Boddy has studied the role of fungi in carbon and nutrient cycling. Boddy has studied priority effects during the establishment of fungal communities in wood. She found that abiotic variables impact the fungal interactions of beech wood, and that fungal combative abilities were sensitive to the ambient temperature. She demonstrated that differences in the abiotic factors between sites can cause variation in the impact of priority effects in wood decay communities. In 2008 Boddy argued in The Guardian that fungi were humankind's most invaluable species. She claims that without fungi, land-based ecosystems, including humans, would not exist.

=== Public engagement ===
Boddy has presented fungi on the television and radio. She contributed to the film Superfungi: Will fungi help save the world?. She served as president of the British Ecological Society in 2009. She founded the British Mycological Society Fungus Day, which is held annually in October to highlight the importance of fungi in ecosystems. Her outreach highlights the role of fungal mycorrhiza in plant health and the impact amateurs and enthusiasts can have on advancing understanding of mycological diversity. In 2009 Boddy was part of a gold medal winning stand at the RHS Chelsea Flower Show. She led the steering committee for the Royal Botanic Garden Edinburgh exhibition From Another Kingdom. Boddy was part of a science opera which was performed at the Green Man Festival in 2017. The performance included Boddy's research into the Wood-Wide Web. In 2016 Boddy was profiled on The Life Scientific. She delivered the 2018 Cardiff University International Women's Day lecture.

== Honours and awards ==
- 1989 British Mycological Society Berkeley Award
- 1999 Society for General Microbiology
- 2011 Elected a Fellow of the Learned Society of Wales (FLSW)
- 2018 Learned Society of Wales Frances Hoggan Medal
- 2018 Honorary doctorate from Abertay University

Boddy was appointed Member of the Order of the British Empire (MBE) in the 2019 Birthday Honours for services to mycology and public engagement in science.

== Publications ==
- Rayner, A.D.; Boddy, Lynne (1995). Fungal decomposition of wood : its biology and ecology. Wiley. ISBN 978-0471103103. OCLC 487040189.
- Frankland, Juliet C.; Van West, P.; Boddy, Lynne (2008). Ecology of saprotrophic basidiomycetes. Elsevier Academic Press. OCLC 243828240.
- Ainsworth, Martyn; Boddy, Lynne; Coleman, Max (2010). From another kingdom : the amazing world of fungi. Royal Botanic Garden, Edinburgh. ISBN 9781906129675. OCLC 920233370.
- Watkinson, Sarah C.; Boddy, Lynne; Money, Nicholas P. (7 January 2016). The fungi (Third ed.). Waltham, MA. ISBN 978-0123820341. OCLC 932528410.
