= Tracey Rogers =

Marine ecologist

- Education: University of Sydney
- Employer: University of New South Wales
- Known for: Leopard Seals

Tracey Rogers is a marine ecologist at the University of New South Wales who studies how mammals survive changing environments.

== Early life and education ==
As a child, Rogers was interested in deadly sea creatures. Rogers became interested in leopard seals whilst working as a seal trainer at Taronga Zoo. The call of Astrid, a giant female leopard seal, inspired Rogers to pursue a career in research. Rogers completed her PhD, "Acoustic behaviour of the leopard seal, Hydrurga leptonyx : physical characteristics and functional significance", in 1997 at the University of Sydney.

== Research and career ==
Rogers has served as director of the Australian Marine Mammal Research Centre.

She joined the University of New South Wales in 2008. Her lab at the University of New South Wales study mammals, in particular the leopard seal (an Antarctic apex predator), and their response to changing environments. To do this, she studies changes in the seals' diet and habits over time. She identified that if mother seals stay with their pups, father seals only use simple, crude calls, whereas if mothers are more adventurous, the language becomes more complex. She also found that female leopard seals can also sing during breeding season, which is rare in the animal world. She believes that leopard seals might use the high-frequency (165 kHz) to echolocate food during dark winters. She identified that more juvenile seals stayed together, where as older, more dominant seals have more established territories.

She studies seals at the Commonwealth Bay and Prydz Bay. The seals are tricky to study as they live in dangerous pack ice off coastal Antarctica, making observations difficult. To identify how the seals respond to a changing ecosystem, Rogers studies them using acoustic technology (hydrophones and retired military sonar buoys). During expeditions, the team take biopsies and collect fur from seals in the wild, which can be used as biomarkers to "capture the changes in an individual's diet, environment, climate, health, and stress levels". These can be compared to seals in museum collections, collected by Douglas Mawson and Ernest Shackleton, to work out how changes in the ecosystem impact the food chain. By understanding how climate change impacts species in the Antarctic, they can predict how they will cope with changes in the future. She is now considered the word-expert in leopard seals.

She has also studied the composition of whale mucus with the Sydney Institute of Marine Science.

Rogers has currently supervised over 19 PhD candidates to completion. She is known as a passionate advocate for advancing equity in science and encouraging youth engagement and interest in science and the natural environment.

== Other activities ==
Rogers contributes to The Conversation, National Geographic, and Nature.

She appeared on the BBC radio program The Life Scientific in September 2017.

== Recognition and awards ==
She was awarded the Australian Institute of Policy and Science Young Tall Poppy Science Researcher prize in 2005, and became the Tall Poppy ambassador in 2009.

The children at Castle Cove Primary School were so inspired by her seal research they wanted to contribute, and raised money for a satellite tracker off the Western Antarctic Peninsula. Rogers named one of the seals they observed Milo, after a school mascot, and the class tracked it in the ocean for 12 months.
