= Amoret =

Amoret may refer to:

- Amoret, Missouri, a city in the Kansas City metropolitan area
- Amoret Whitaker, British forensic entomologist
- Amoret, a character in Edmund Spenser's 1590 poem The Faerie Queene
- Amoret, a character in John Fletcher's 1608 play The Faithful Shepherdess

== See also ==
- The Amorettes, a Scottish hard rock band
- Amorette Wild (born 1989), Australian netball player
- Amore (disambiguation)
