= Mark Spencer (botanist) =

Forensic botanist

Mark Spencer is a British forensic botanist and botanical consultant. He also monitors the changing composition of London's plantlife. He is the honorary botany curator for the Linnean Society of London.

== Early life ==
Spencer was born in 1968. He became enthusiastic about plants as a child, especially plant identification and growth habits. He was brought up in the rural setting of Warmington, Warwickshire and his family supported this interest. He disliked secondary school due to attacks and extensive bullying related to his strong opinions and homosexuality and left with few qualifications.

In the 1990s, Spencer worked in bars in Soho in London and was involved in HIV/AIDS activism around Section 28 as well as the AIDS pandemic.

== Botanical education and career ==
He took a BSc degree in botany at the University of Reading in his late 20s followed by a PhD specialising in Oomycete aquatic fungi supervised by Michael Dick. He subsequently worked in the Natural History Museum, London as a research assistant and then botany curator. This led him to plant taxonomy and systematics. Spencer is also involved in recording the natural history of the urban environment of London, especially the arrival of new species, often through the international horticultural trade.

From around 2016, he has worked as a consultant forensic botanist. This started from a chance phone enquiry from the police. Spencer uses both field and laboratory methods to analyse features such as plant growth habit and microscopic fragments. He has found that observation of the growth of plants such as brambles (Rubus fruticosus) can be very informative for estimating the time elapsed since a human body came to rest in woodland or hedgerows.

Spencer is a Fellow of the Linnean Society of London and honorary curator of the society's herbariums.

In March 2021, he was the guest on an episode of the BBC Radio 4 programme The Life Scientific.

== Publications ==
Spencer is the author of the book Murder Most Florid: inside the mind of a forensic botanist published in 2019.

He is also co-author of over 10 scientific publications including:

- Chris A. Skilbeck, Iris Lynch, Maggie Ellenby, Mark A. Spencer (2019) Achene Morphology of British and Irish Mayweeds and Chamomiles: implications for taxonomy and identification British and Irish Botany 1 (2) 128-166
- Kenneth G. Johnson, Stephen J. Brooks, Phillip B. Fenberg, Adrian G. Glover, Karen E. James, Adrian M. Lister, Ellinor Michel, Mark Spencer, Jonathan A. Todd, Eugenia Valsami-Jones, Jeremy R. Young, John R. Stewart (2011) Climate Change and Biosphere Response: Unlocking the Collections Vault. BioScience 61 (2) 147-153
- Mark A. Spencer, Linda M. Irvine, Charles E. Jarvis (2009) Typification of Linnaean names relevant to algal nomenclature Taxon
- MA Spencer, MC Vick, MW Dick (2002) Revision of Aplanopsis, Pythiopsis, and ‘subcentric’ Achlya species (Saprolegniaceae) using 18S rDNA and morphological data Mycological Research 106 (5) 549-560
