= Hazel Rymer =

British volcanologist

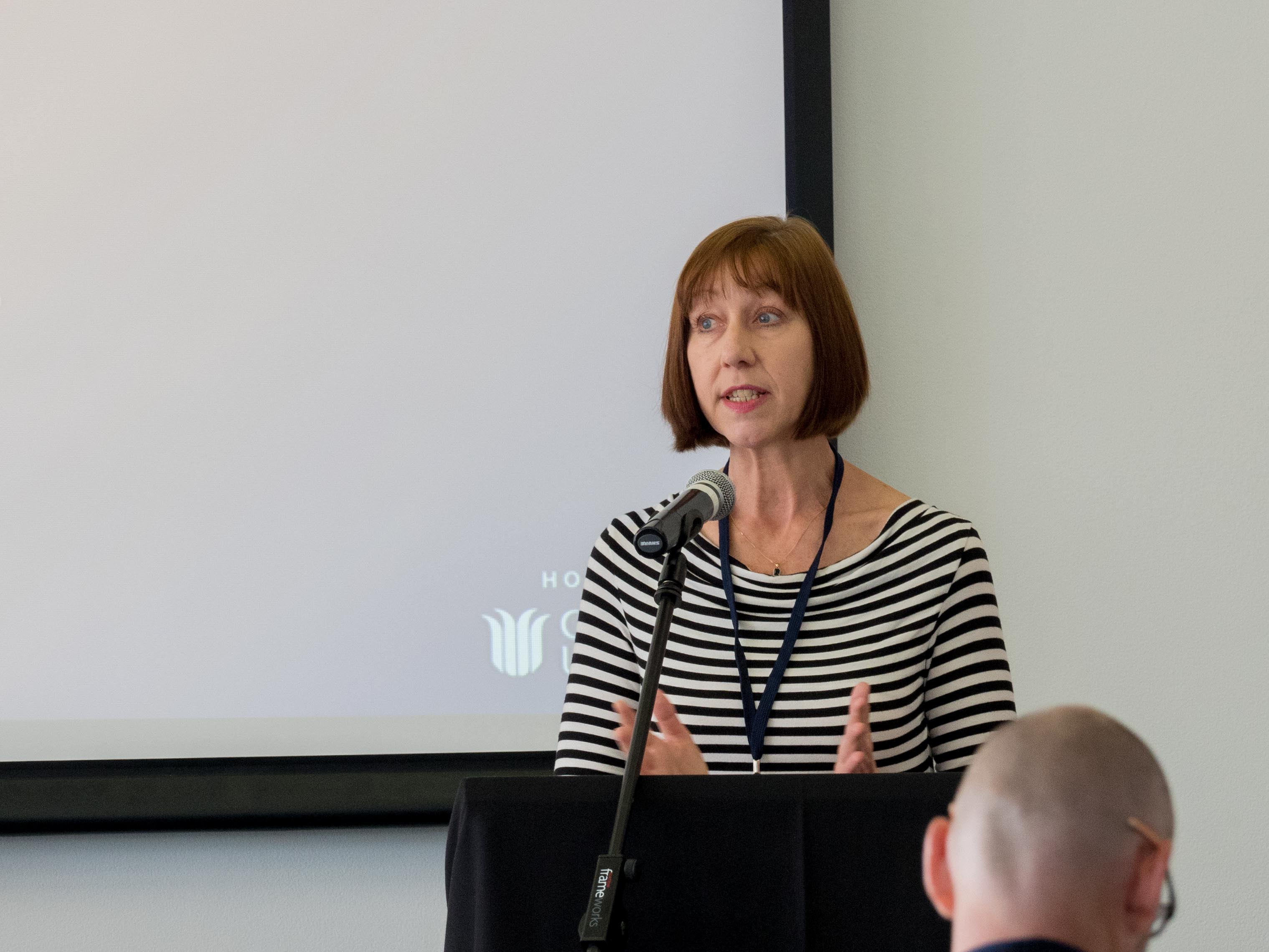
- Education: University of Reading (BSc); Open University (PhD)
- Scientific career
- Fields: Volcanology
- Workplaces: Open University
- Thesis: Gravity studies of sub-surface structures and evolution of active volcanoes in Costa Rica (1985)
- Website: www.open.ac.uk/people/hr4

Hazel Rymer is a British volcanologist and pro-vice chancellor at the Open University. Her research investigates how active volcanoes affect their environment and impact global climate change. She leads the citizen science project Earth Watch.

== Early life and education ==
Rymer grew up in Reading, Berkshire and studied physics at the University of Reading. She earned her PhD in geophysics from the Open University which studied sub-surfaces of volcanoes in Costa Rica. She looked at the structure of pit craters in Masaya Volcano.

== Career and research ==
Rymer's research focuses on the environmental and ecological hazards posed by active volcanoes. Rymer looked to track the volatile flux of the Mount Etna, Masaya and Poás volcanoes by monitoring the volcanic plume and environmental sinks. She chose these volcanoes because they have persistent, low levels of volcanic activity. Her research looks to inform evacuation strategies and crop cultivation.

Rymer developed new techniques to evaluate the size of supervolcanoes. She has worked on new microgravity meters to monitor the magma inside volcanoes. The gravity meters contain very sensitive spring balances. Rymer places these meters at hundreds of places across a volcano, developing a contour map that details how gravity varies in space. Rymer monitored the volcanoes for extended periods of time, in an effort to monitor the movement of magma, and whether eruptions will be explosive or not. She has kept one gravity meter (GM513) for thirty years. She holds several patents for low-cost gravity meters.

She began to study Poás Volcano, which she describes as her favourite, in 1989. Because she has been following it for so long, she has been able to develop forecasts about when the volcano may erupt in the future. She began a citizen science project with Earthwatch on Masaya volcano in Nicaragua in 2008, and has used this to engage members of the public in earth monitoring. Volunteers use Global Positioning System (GPS) sensors to monitor for volcanic gases and devices that collect geoelectric information. Whilst monitoring the Poás Volcano, information from the citizen scientists helped the National Park officials restrict access to the crater during the 2009 degassing. These informed operational guidelines for monitoring degassing for Nicaragua and Costa Rica. As part of her monitoring work, Rymer visited the Poás Volcano in January 2009 when there was a 6.2 magnitude earthquake. The Poás Volcano erupted in 2009 and prevented further study.

She also worked on Askja, a stratovolcano in Iceland, and observed changes in the seismic activity in 2007. She then investigated whether the magma was travelling north and whether it was accumulating below Krafla. She is interested in the environmental impact of volcanoes. She has investigated whether plants and soil are impacted by volcano-derived heavy elements, so-called "bio-indicators". She developed a molecular biology test to monitor the hairs of Tradescantia pallida, where volcanic pollution can cause a visible mutations of a recessive gene that can cause chromosomal damage in pollen. Her group also use inductively coupled plasma mass spectrometry to study the concentrations of heavy elements in plant material.

She served for six years on the council of the Geological Society of London. She is on the executive committee of the International Council for Open and Distance Education. She contributed to the 2015 Encyclopedia of Volcanoes. In 2016 Rymer appeared on The Life Scientific. Rymer was appointed pro-vice chancellor at the Open University in 2018.
