= Sheila Willis =

Irish forensic scientist (born 1952)

Sheila M. Willis
- Born: 11 June 1952
- Education: University College Dublin
- Known for: Director General of Forensic Science, Ireland
- Scientific career
- Workplaces: Forensic Science Ireland
- Thesis: (1977)
- Doctoral advisors: Anthony Manning

Sheila Willis (born 11 June 1952) is an Irish forensic scientist and was director general of Forensic Science Ireland from 2002 to 2016.

== Early life and education ==
Sheila M. Willis was as an undergraduate at University College Dublin and subsequently carried out postgraduate research supervised by Anthony Manning for the award of PhD in 1977.

== Career ==
Her first employment was as a chemist at Clondalkin Paper Mills. She was subsequently employed in as a civil servant in the Irish forensic science laboratory and promoted, reaching the position of laboratory director. She was Director General of Forensic Science Ireland from 2002 to 2016. She developed the analytical facilities as well as recruiting a multidisciplinary team. This included DNA profiling analysis and initiating a national Irish DNA database in 2015 as the technology developed. Her final achievement before retiring was overseeing the foundation of a new purpose-built Forensic Science Laboratory building near Celbridge, Co Kildare.

Willis has been chair of the Association of Forensic Science Providers and has advised the UK and Irish governments. Standards and ethics for reporting forensic data and she chaired the group that produced the European Network of Forensic Science Institutes guidelines for evaluative reporting.

She is an honorary professor at the University of Dundee and member of the advisory board for the university's Leverhulme Research Centre for Forensic Science.

In 2024 she was a guest on the BBC Radio 4 programme The Life Scientific, interviewed by Jim Al-Khalili.

== Awards and honours ==
Willis was the recipient of the Boyle Higgins gold medal and lecture award from the Institute of Chemistry of Ireland in 2013. She received the UCD Alumni Award in Science in 2017. In 2019 Willis was awarded an honorary DSc by University College, Dublin. Willis was president of The Chartered Society of Forensic Sciences from 2020 until 2022.
