= Gillian Forrester =

Professor of comparative cognition

Gillian Sebestyen Forrester
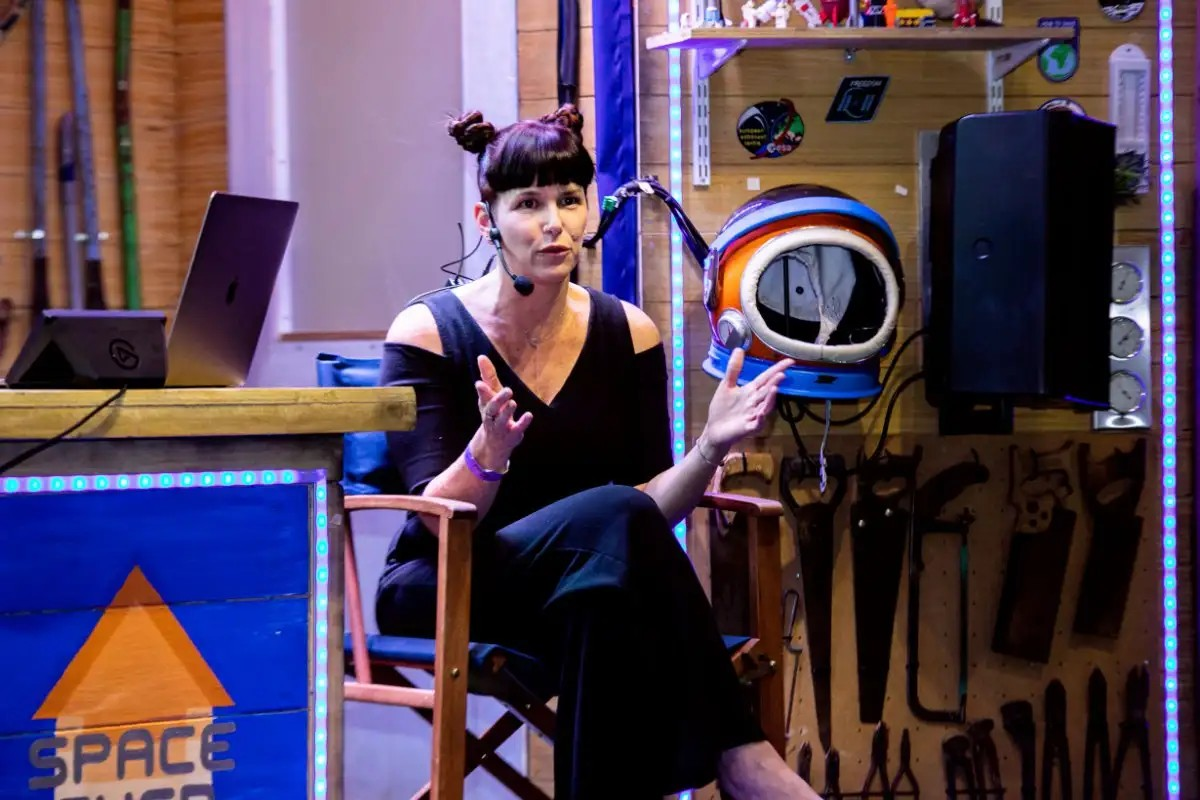
- Forrester at New Scientist Live
- Born: Gillian Forrester
- Education: University of California, San Diego Bachelor of Science; University of Oxford DPhil
- Known for: Great apes studies; Infant development; Cognitive science; Women in science advocacy; Public science; Science communication; Science Advocacy; Women in Science
- Spouse: Eric Drass
- Awards: Royal Society Rosalind Franklin Award (2025) Nomination
- Scientific career
- Fields: Cognitive science & psychology, experimental neuroscience, evolutionary and developmental psychology, comparative cognition
- Workplaces: University of California, San Diego; University of Oxford; University of London; University of Westminster University of Sussex
- Thesis: Shifting attention based on perception or linguistic information: Behavioural and electrophysiological studies (2000)
- Website: mehuman.io Official website gillianforrester.com - Official website

Gillian Sebestyen Forrester is a professor of comparative cognition at the University of Sussex and director of the Comparative Cognition Group, investigating the behaviour and brain organisation of human and great apes. She regularly discusses her work in popular science shows, on radio and television, and in science podcasts. Her work has featured in such publications such as The Washington Post, Discover magazine and New Scientist. In her position as a popular science educator she has participated in televised interviews by the Royal Society, CNN and BBC regarding her research work comparing great ape and human development.

She is the founder of the "Me, Human" project, which engages in public outreach and education and advocates for women and girls in science, focusing on human cognition through talks and live demonstrations, using such platforms as Live Science and Psyched!

In 2025 she was Principal Curator of Science Futures at Glastonbury Festival.

== Education and teaching ==
Forrester studied in the United States at the University of California, San Diego, achieving a BSc in Cognitive Science and Psychology; and in the United Kingdom at the University of Oxford, achieving a PhD in Experimental Neuroscience. Forrester was Professor of Comparative Cognition at the University of London, until 2022 and is currently Professor of Comparative Cognition at the University of Sussex.

== Work ==
Forrester works in the fields of cognitive science, experimental neuroscience as well as evolutionary and developmental psychology, studying the evolution and behaviour of great apes and humans. Forrester's work follows on from the ape and chimpanzee behavioural research and studies by naturalists Dian Fossey and Jane Goodall, with a remit to better understand human evolution and the development of language, bi-pedalism and tool usage.

In the science magazine Discover Forrester said:

Humans have more objects and are doing more object-driven things. If we narrow down hand dominance in apes to tool use... we find apes are certainly significantly right-handed for tool use. Motor biases are seen throughout the animal world, all the way back to 500 million years ago and the emergence of vertebrates, and possibly even older than that.

In an interview with Mensa IQ magazine, Forrester is quoted as saying:

We originally thought humans were unique in having parts of their brains dedicated to language. But natural selection doesn't really do that. We think that language was originally physical; a gestural system. If we want to dispel the fact that language is unique to humans, we need to show how it links to these older behaviours.

Forrester acts as an advocate for popular, public science communication, often appearing in mainstream science programmes to make science more accessible, as well as advocating for women and girls in STEM, and great ape conservation. In 2023 she was director of the Science Futures field at Glastonbury Festival. Forrester is the founder of the "Me, Human" project, which engages in public outreach and education and advocates for women and girls in science. Through this project, Forrester collaborates with the public to further popular science and to educate about human cognition through talks and live demonstrations via platforms such as Live Science and Psyched!

== Media ==
Forrester regularly discusses her work on popular science radio shows on radio (BBC Radio 4, BBC Local), and television (BBC, CNN, Reuters, BBC South East), and science podcasts (Level Up Human, BBC Crowd Science). Forrester has also written about her work in articles for such science magazines such as Psychology Today, Early Years Educator, and Autism Parenting Magazine. Her work has featured in The Washington Post, The Conversation, Mensa IQ magazine, Discover magazine and New Scientist and in her position as a popular science educator she has participated in televised interviews by the Royal Society, CNN and BBC, regarding her research work with great apes and human development.

Since 2019, Forrester has fostered public science engagement through mainstream contributions to television programmes such as Brain Hacks, BBC’s The Incredible Human Hand, and Puzzle Solving Great Apes; digital broadcasts, BBC CrowdScience; in radio on BBC Radio 4 Supersenses, BBC Radio 4's The Shock, and Speaking in Public; podcasts such as Level Up Human, Ecoflix, and Talking Apes; and news media such as The Conversation and New Scientist.

Public talks and exhibitions Forrester has contributed to include "New Scientist Live", Psyched!, London Science Museum, Royal Society's "Summer Science Live 2024", and music and science festivals such as Bluedot, Norwich Science Festival and the Glastonbury Festival, of which she was made the Principal Curator of the Science Futures field in 2025.

In 2025 Forrester filmed an appearance for two episodes of Horizon: Secrets of the Brain, as a consultant and guest, being interviewed by the BBC science presenter Jim Al-Khalili. In September 2026 she was the guest for BBC Radio 4's The Life Scientific, in which she was again interviewed by Al-Khalili.

== Selected bibliography ==
- Malatesta, Gianluca; Forrester, Gillian S. (12 December 2025). Hand, Limb, and Other Motor Preferences. Neuromethods. Vol. 217. Springer Nature. pp. 171–215. doi:10.1007/978-1-0716-4240-5_6. ISBN 978-1-0716-4239-9.
- Donati, Georgina; Edginton, Trudi; Bardo, Ameline; Kivell, Tracy L.; Ballieux, Haiko; Stamate, Cosmin; Forrester, Gillian S. (2 July 2024). "Motor-sensory biases". Scientific Reports. Springer Nature. doi:10.1038/s41598-024-64372-2. PMC 11219847.
- Davis, R.; Donati, G.; Finnegan, K.; Boardman, J. P.; Dean, B.; Fletcher-Watson, S.; Forrester, G. S. (3 February 2022). "Social gaze in preterm infants". Child Development. 93 (4): 869–880. doi:10.1111/cdev.13734. PMC 9545542. PMID 35112717.
- Bardo A; Kivell TL; Town K; Donati G; Ballieux H; Stamate C; Edginton T; Forrester GS (14 May 2021). "Get a Grip: Variation in Human Hand Grip Strength and Implications for Human Evolution". Symmetry. doi:10.3390/sym13071142.
- Donati, G.; Davis, R.; Forrester, G. S. (6 August 2020). "Gaze Behaviour to Lateral Face Stimuli in Infants". Scientific Reports. 10 (1): 13185. doi:10.1038/s41598-020-69898-9. PMC 7411063. PMID 32764733.
- "Evolutionary Motor Biases and Cognition in Children with and without Autism". link.springer.com. 15 October 2020. doi:10.1038/s41598-020-74224-4. PMC 7566622. PMID 33060674.
- Forrester, G. S.; Davis, R.; Mareschal, D.; Malatesta, G.; Todd, B. K. (September 2019). "The Left Cradling Bias: An Evolutionary Facilitator of Social Cognition". Cortex. 118: 116–131. doi:10.1016/j.cortex.2018.05.011. PMID 29961539.
- Forrester, G. S.; Todd, B. K. (2018). A Comparative Perspective. Progress in Brain Research. Vol. 238. pp. 377–403. doi:10.1016/bs.pbr.2018.06.014. PMID 30097201.
- Forrester, G. S.; Rodriguez, A. (August 2015). "Slip of the Tongue: Implications for Evolution and Language Development". Cognition. 141: 103–111. doi:10.1016/j.cognition.2015.04.012. PMID 25966841.
- Forrester, G. S.; Pegler, R.; Thomas, M. S.; Mareschal, D. (15 July 2014). "Handedness As a Marker". Behavioural Brain Research. 268: 14–21. doi:10.1016/j.bbr.2014.03.040. PMID 24704491.
- Forrester, G. S.; Quaresmini, C.; Leavens, D. A.; Mareschal, D.; Thomas, M. S. (15 January 2013). "Human Handedness: An Inherited Evolutionary Trait". Behavioural Brain Research. 237: 200–206. doi:10.1016/j.bbr.2012.09.037. PMID 23022751.
- Forrester, G. S.; Quaresmini, C.; Leavens, D. A.; Spiezio, C.; Vallortigara, G. (25 July 2012). "Target Animacy". Animal Cognition. 15 (6): 1121–1127. doi:10.1007/s10071-012-0536-4. PMID 22829099.
- Forrester, G. S.; Leavens, D. A.; Quaresmini, C.; Vallortigara, G. (12 May 2011). "Target Animacy". Animal Cognition. 14 (6): 903–907. doi:10.1007/s10071-011-0413-6. PMID 21562817.
- Forrester, Gillian Sebestyen (November 2008). "Science Direct: A Multidimensional Approach to Investigations". Animal Behaviour. link.springer.com. doi:10.1016/j.anbehav.2008.05.026.
