= Immunocore =

Biotechnology company

- Type: Public
- Traded as: Nasdaq: IMCR
- Industry: Biotechnology
- Founded: 2008 in Oxford, England
- Founders: Bent Jakobsen and James Noble
- Headquarters: Abingdon-on-Thames, United Kingdom
- Key people: Bahija Jallal, CEO; Sir John Bell, Chairman; Brian Di Donato, CFO and Head of Strategy; David Berman, Head of R&D
- Products: Cancer drugs/treatments using T-Cell receptor technology
- Website: www.immunocore.com

Immunocore is a global commercial-stage biotechnology company, based in Oxfordshire, which researches and develops biological drugs using soluble T-cell receptor technology.

== History ==
Immunocore was founded in 2008 as a spinout of MediGene AG, which acquired Avidex in 2006. The core technology was spun out of Oxford University in 1999 by Bent Jakobsen into Avidex Ltd.

In July 2015, Immunocore announced the completion of an initial $320 million private financing round, Europe's largest ever financing round by a private life sciences company. Fidelity Management & Research Company, Woodford Investment Management, Malin Corporation, Eli Lilly and Company, and RTW Investments all participated in this fundraise along with other unnamed investors and existing shareholders.

In September 2017, the Bill and Melinda Gates Foundation announced a $40 million investment in Immunocore to accelerate the development of Immunocore's ImmTAV and ImmTAB therapeutics.

In March 2020, Immunocore announced the closing of its $130 million Series B private financing round. In January 2021, Immunocore announced the closing of its $75 million Series C round. Immunocore went public in February 2021, with closing announced on 9 February 2021.

== Scientific background ==
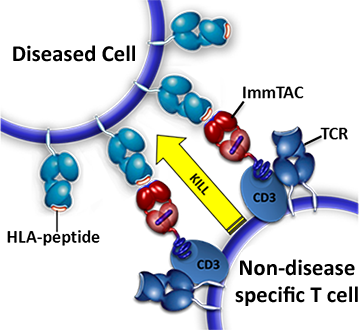
A schematic representation of the mechanism of action for ImmTACs

T cell receptors (TCRs) are molecules found on the surface of T lymphocytes (or T cells) and play various roles in the immune system. TCRs are often cited as aiding in recognising foreign antigens being presented by cells which have been infected by viruses or intracellular bacteria. Immunocore has developed a line of biologic medicines by combining engineered, cancer-recognising, soluble TCRs with immune activating complexes that direct the immune system to kill cancer cells. These drugs are commonly referred to as immune-mobilising monoclonal TCRs against cancer (ImmTAC molecules).

== Clinical pipeline ==
=== IMCgp100 (Tebentafusp) ===
Tebentafusp is a soluble, bi-specific T cell engager. On 23 November 2020, Immunocore announced a Phase 3 data readout for tebentafusp in the field of immuno-oncology. In Jan 2022 the US FDA approved tebentafusp-tebn for HLA-A*02:01-positive adult patients with unresectable or metastatic uveal melanoma.

=== Other Pipeline Programs ===
Immunocore's other pipeline programs include IMC-C103C, an ImmTAC candidate in Phase 1 partnered with Genentech for the treatment of solid tumors expressing MAGE-A4, and IMC-F106C, an ImmTAC candidate which is also in Phase 1 studies for solid tumors expressing PRAME. Earlier programs include candidates for the treatment of hepatitis B virus (HBV) and human immunodeficiency virus (HIV).

== Corporate governance ==
Sir John Bell serves as Immunocore's chairman of the board. Bahija Jallal is chief executive officer and director of the board, with several other board members, including Nobel Laureate Peter J. Ratcliffe.

== See also ==
- Antibody-drug conjugate
- Immunostimulant
