= Taronga Conservation Society =

Australian research organisation

Taronga Conservation Society logo

The Taronga Conservation Society is a Government of New South Wales agency responsible for Taronga Zoo Sydney and the Taronga Western Plains Zoo in New South Wales, Australia. The board is a part of the Australian Regional Association of Zoological Parks. It sponsors a number of research centres, such as the Australian Marine Mammal Research Centre. The agency's role was outlined in the Zoological Parks Board Act 1973 and Amendment Act 1992 and fall within the jurisdiction of the Minister for the Environment.
