= Eric Drass =

- Born: Keynsham, England
- Genres: Art, digital art, artificial intelligence, journalism
- Occupations: Painter, digital artist, technology writer
- Years active: 2000–present
- Spouse: Gillian Forrester
- Website: Shardcore

Eric Drass is a British multi-media artist working in the areas of fine art and, under the pseudonym Shardcore, digital AI, subjects about which he also writes, speaks and lectures. He has been interviewed on these subjects by the BBC, The Guardian and featured as a guest presenter by The Royal Institution.

Born in Keynsham, on the outskirts of Bristol, Drass attended the University of Oxford, attaining a BSc degree in Philosophy before studying for a PhD in cognitive psycholinguistics, specialising in studied language acquisition in children. At university he coded his own neural networks and saw his first web page appear on one of the Internet's earliest browsers, NCSA Mosaic. After starting a technology company that then collapsed during the dotcom bubble, Drass began concentrating on art.

== Fine Art ==
=== Painting ===
Drass is a Saatchi Gallery's Saatchi Art exhibited artist, among other UK galleries, whose work is predominantly figurative with abstract and surreal elements. Multi-media works include 'Who Watches the Watchers?', a painting of the then UK Foreign Secretary, William Hague, that incorporated surveillance cameras watching the viewer, and which was made for the 2013 Brighton Festival.

=== Sculpture ===
Exhibiting during the Brighton Festival in 2008, under the pseudonym Shardcore, Drass collaborated with artist Sam Hewitt (under the collective name The Fortunecats) in 2009 tho hold exhibition in St Paul's church in Brighton. Drass and Hewitt also collaborated on robotised Japanese Fortune Cat sculptures commissioned by Brighton & Hove council for the White Night Festival in Brighton. One of the sculptures was later shown at the 'Art of Bots' exhibition in 2016 at Somerset House.

== Digital Art ==
Drass has used his background in coding and computing to both write about digital art and also to create digital art of his own that comments on media, surveillance technology, social media and artificial intelligence, creating interactive works for exhibitions and festivals in London and Brighton. In 2015, Drass was interviewed by The Guardian about his AI generated images and messages on social media featuring North Korean leader Kim Jong-un: 'Inspired by the release of 310 new political propaganda slogans by North Korea last week, Eric Drass, a painter and digital artist based in the UK, has used a mathematical algorithm to randomly generate a new set of political phrases'.

Continuing his experimentation with digital media, Drass was interviewed in 2014 by technology website Gizmodo about his AI project to autogenerate fictitious 'facts' to be promoted on Twitter under Drass's then Twitter account, Factbot . The project did accidentally generate a fact that turned out to be true, and which lends the article its title 'That Time a Lying Factbot Accidentally Told The Truth'

In 2017, Drass was approached by the BBC to create a 'deep fake' video of Ian Hislop as a professional dancer. for the presenter's documentary 'Ian Hislop's Fake News: A True History' after the BBC's own R&D department had not been able to produce usable results. Drass's deep fake video of Hislop, along with an interview between the two, was broadcast in 2019.

During the COVID-19 pandemic, Drass took the recently released COVID-19 DNA sequence and converted it into musical notes, creating a two-hour 'song' of the virus's composition.

In 2019, Drass collaborated with author, John Higgs, (using the AI pseudonym AlgoHiggs), to produce one of the earliest AI generated novels, 'The Future has Already Begun', using ChatGPT to learn Higgs' writing style before being given the opening sentence of each chapter. Drass again worked with the Higgs in 2021 to produce AI generated images based on Higgs's book William Blake Vs The World using the program BigSleep and the artificial intelligence generators CLIP and BiGAN. In an interview with Futurism magazine, Drass said he'd spent the several years training AI models, built with machine learning tools including Nvidia's StyleGAN and Google's DeepDream, to produce images of AI erotica for the website, The Machine Gaze.

In 2022, Drass's work featured in the first ever art-science exhibition held at the Glastonbury Festival as part of the festival's new 'Science Futures' area.

== Lectures ==
Drass has appeared as a featured lecturer at the Brighton Data Forum and as a guest lecturer at the Royal Institution during their Christmas 2023 lecture by Mike Wooldridge

== Filmography ==
- Looking Glass (2019)

== Bibliography ==
- 'The Future has Already Begun' with John Higgs (2019)

== Events ==
- The Brighton Festival exhibition (2008)
- White Night Festival exhibition (2009)
- Art of The Bots, Somerset House (2016)
- Brighton Data Forum lecture (2021)
- Glastonbury Festival exhibition (2022)
- The Royal Institution Christmas Lecture (2023)
