= Julia Simner =

British psychologist and professor

Julia Claire Simner
- Education: University of Sussex; University of Oxford; University of Toronto
- Scientific career
- Workplaces: University of Sussex; University of Edinburgh
- Thesis: Engaging long and short term memory during anaphor comprehension (2001)

Julia Claire Simner is a British psychologist and professor of neuropsychology at the University of Sussex. Her research focuses on sensory diversity, examining a range of sensory traits, including synesthesia, misophonia and aphantasia.

== Early life and education ==
Simner completed her undergraduate studies in Modern Languages at the University of Oxford before receiving an Ontario Open Scholarship to undertake graduate research in Linguistics and Psycholinguistics at the University of Toronto. She later held an ESRC doctoral studentship at the University of Sussex, where her PhD examined memory activation during linguistic inference from anaphoric expressions. Following her doctorate, she was awarded a British Academy Postdoctoral Fellowship and subsequently moved to the University of Edinburgh. In 2005 she joined the faculty there as a lecturer, held a Leverhulme Early Career Fellowship, and was promoted to reader in 2010. She was appointed professor of neuropsychology at the University of Sussex in 2014.

== Research and career ==
At Sussex, Simner is the director of the MULTISENSE laboratory, where she studies how unique brains process the sensory world. Amongst these special sensory traits, Simner studies synaesthesia, a neurological condition that links and merges senses. Synaesthesia impacts over 4% of the population. Simner has developed several strategies to investigate synaesthesia and ways to identify how genuine synaesthetes report of synaesthesia. For example, people with synaesthesia are consistent in their reports (e.g. the same pairings of trigger and responses) over long periods of time. Functional magnetic resonance imaging of synaesthete's brains reveal bilateral activation in response to words (e.g. their taste centres activate when they hear words). She has shown that synaesthesia is heritable, that it is linked to the X chromosome, and that it develops after conception.

Simner has studied synaesthesia amongst children, and showed that 1.3% had grapheme-colour synaesthesia.

As part of her work in promoting the public understanding of science, Simner is the science officer for the UK Synaesthesia Association. She has been interviewed for numerous media outlets and programmes exploring human perception, including All in the Mind (BBC radio) with Claudia Hammond, Curious Cases of Rutherford and Fry, and the BBC Sounds episode of Curious Cases presented by Hannah Fry and Dara Ó Briain.

In 2025 she was featured on BBC Radio 4's The Life Scientific with Jim Al-Khalili.

Her research has been discussed widely in the media, including coverage in The New York Times, New Scientist, Science, Scientific American, The Conversation and BBC Radio 4 & World Service's The Compass, and There’s No Such Thing as a Fish Her work has also appeared in National Geographic and Psychology Today. She has been interviewed for additional programmes on perception and language, including BBC Future. Simner has also given public talks for events such as New Scientist Live, and has collaborated on arts‑science projects, including a performance with the Winnipeg Symphony Orchestra.

Simner is Science Lead for CrossSense, winners of the 2026 Longitude Prize on Dementia, an international challenge prize rewarding innovative technology that solves global problems. She was recognised by the Atomium Culture initiative of the Atomium European Institute for Science and Democracy (EISMD), as part of its European efforts to strengthen science communication and public engagement. Her Oxford Handbook was shortlisted for the British Medical Association Medical Book of the year, and was Highly Commended in the Category of Psychiatry.

== Select publications ==
- Julia Simner (2019) Synaesthesia: A Very Short Introduction. Oxford University Press. pp160. ISBN 9780198749219
- Julia Simner and Edward Hubbard (editors) 2013. The Oxford Handbook of Synesthesia Oxford University Press. pp 1104. ISBN 9780191750885.
- Julia Simner (2011). "Defining synaesthesia" (PDF). British Journal of Psychology. 103 (1): 1–15. doi:10.1348/000712610x528305. PMID 22229768. Wikidata Q22306114.
- Julia Simner; Catherine Mulvenna; Noam Sagiv; Elias Tsakanikos; Sarah A Witherby; Christine Fraser; Kirsten Scott; Ward, Jamie (2006). "Synaesthesia: the prevalence of atypical cross-modal experiences". Perception. 35 (8): 1024–1033. doi:10.1068/p5469. PMID 17076063. Wikidata Q30542080.
- Julia Simner; Ward, Jamie; Monika Lanz; Ashok Jansari; Krist Noonan; Glover, Louise; David A Oakley (2005). "Non-random associations of graphemes to colours in synaesthetic and non-synaesthetic populations". Cognitive Neuropsychology. 22 (8): 1069–1085. doi:10.1080/02643290500200122. PMID 21038290. Wikidata Q34624896.
