= Judith Bunbury =

British geoarchaeologist

- Born: 7 February 1967 (age 59)
- Other names: Judith Mervyn Richardson-Bunbury; JM Richardson-Bunbury; Judith Richardson-Bunbury; J Bunbury
- Education: Durham University; New Hall, Cambridge
- Spouse: Jonathan Collis
- Children: 2
- Scientific career
- Workplaces: University of Cambridge
- Thesis: The basalts of Kula and their relation to extension in Western Turkey (1992)
- Doctoral advisors: Dan McKenzie

Judith Mervyn Richardson-Bunbury, known professionally as Judith Bunbury, is a British geoarchaeologist. Bunbury was the senior tutor at St Edmund's College, Cambridge until 2023. Her work has characterised the movement of the river across the Nile valley over the last 10,000 years, and its impact on Egyptian civilisation.

== Early life and education ==
The daughter of a Royal Navy officer, Bunbury studied Natural Sciences at Durham University, where she specialised in geology and geophysics, and realised she enjoyed fieldwork. Inspired by a lecture from the Cambridge geophysicist Dan McKenzie, she asked to do a PhD with him, awarded in 1992. This was a study of basalts from Turkey.

== Career ==
Following the completion of her doctorate, Bunbury worked as a postdoc at the Institute of Archaeology in Ankara in Turkey (1993–1994). She joined the Department of Earth Sciences at the University of Cambridge as a research fellow in 1994. Bunbury worked on a new project at University of Cambridge in development of mass spectrometry equipment to estimate how the rocks of the Himalayas were dissolving.

Her skills and experience were then applied to archaeological sites in Egypt. It was development of methods to apply geological auger boring techniques to these sites, as well as photographs from the air and satellites, that led to a new consensus that the course of the river in the Nile valley had moved very substantially over the millennia, causing profound impacts such as on the location of buildings. For example, the precise sites of buildings in the Karnak temple complex depended on where the river Nile was at the time each was built. The details of waste from human settlements and sediments retrieved in the boring core samples allowed dating and interpretation for the changing uses of the location, as sites changed between dry land and river, marsh or lakes. She works in collaboration with archaeologists to characterise the materials found in cores of sediments in sites in Egypt, especially the Nile Valley and other places of archaeological interest.

From 2015 onwards her research focus moved address how climate change had resulted in changes in landscapes, through surveying locations in the Sahara. This led to reinterpretation of landscapes such as the Valley of the Kings as having trees, lakes and animal life 3500 years ago, rather than being sand deserts.

In 2022 she was a guest on The Life Scientific on BBC Radio 4.

== Personal life ==
She married Canon Jonathan Collis. He was curate at St Neots, chaplain at Jesus College, Cambridge and the vicar of Thorpe Bay for twelve years until 2021. A daughter was born in 2001, and another lovely daughter was born in 2005.

== Publications ==
Bunbury is the author or co-author of several books and over 40 scientific publications. The books include:

- Judith Bunbury (2019) The Nile and Ancient Egypt. Changing Land- and Waterscapes, from the Neolithic to the Roman Era Cambridge University Press pp 181 ISBN 9781107012158

Her most significant scientific publications include:

- B. T. Pennington, J. Bunbury, and N. Hovius, (2016) Emergence of civilization, changes in fluvio-deltaic style, and nutrient redistribution forced by Holocene sea-level rise. Geoarchaeology 31 (3) 194–210.
- JK Hillier, JM Bunbury, A Graham (2007) Monuments on a migrating Nile. Journal of Archaeological Science 34 (7) 1011-1015
- T Ahmad, N Harris, M Bickle, H Chapman, J Bunbury, C Prince (2000) Isotopic constraints on the structural relationships between the lesser Himalayan series and the high Himalayan crystalline series, Garhwal Himalaya Geological Society of America Bulletin 112 (3) 467-477
- I Shaw, J Bunbury, R Jameson (1999) Emerald mining in Roman and Byzantine Egypt. Journal of Roman Archaeology 12 203-215
