= Liz Seward =

British space scientist

- Born: Elizabeth Seward
- Education: University of Leicester, UK
- Scientific career
- Fields: Space science
- Workplaces: Airbus

Elizabeth Seward is Senior Strategist at Space Systems for Airbus. She has worked on several projects during her career including meteorological satellites and landers for missions to Mars and a comet. She is also involved with programmes supporting increased diversity within the space science workforce.

== Education ==
As a teenager, Seward was inspired to seek a career within astronautics by the science fiction collection at her local library after her family moved to California, USA for a time. She attended University of Leicester, UK from 1997 and gained an MPhys degree in physics with Space Science & Technology in 2001.

== Career ==
Her first role after graduation was at Astrium as a thermal engineer working within EUMETSAT projects. Later she was a Senior Mission Systems Engineer within the Space Science Group on several projects including the early design of the ExoMars rover. In 2008 she became Marketing & Technical Communications Manager for Earth Observation & Science. In 2013 she was appointed Head of the Marketing and Communications team for Airbus Defence and Space in the Earth Observation, Navigation and Science department, and from 2018 was Senior Strategist at the company's Space Systems.

While at Astrium she worked on the design of a lander (later discontinued) in the ESA BepiColombo mission. She was also involved with meteorological satellites including Sentinel-5P that observes air pollution and Aelous that records the Earth's wind speeds. She has also worked on Skynet communications satellite projects.

She has been a STEM Ambassador since 2001 and participates in public discussion of space programmes, such as at the HowTheLightGetsIn festival in 2019.

She was involved in setting up the UK group of Women in Aerospace - Europe and has been its lead since 2016, and subsequently an executive board member. Seward has also been a committee member of the International Astronautical Federation since 2011.

== Awards and honours ==
In 2015 Seward received a Young Space Leader award from the International Astronautical Federation that recognises leadership demonstrated by young professionals under 35.

In 2019 she was awarded a Rising Star Award - Diversity by WeAreTheCity that recognises the achievements of women below management positions in the UK and India.

In 2020 she was the guest in an episode of The Life Scientific on BBC Radio 4.
