= Vicky Tolfrey =

British sports scientist

Vicky L. Goosey-Tolfrey
- Born: Harrogate, Yorkshire
- Education: Manchester Metropolitan University, UK
- Scientific career
- Workplaces: Loughborough University, UK
- Thesis: Pushing economy and wheelchair propulsion technique of wheelchair racers.

Vicky Goosey-Tolfrey is a British sports scientist specialising in Para sport. She is Professor of Applied Disability and Para sport and is Director of Peter Harrison Centre for Disability Sport at Loughborough University. She was awarded the International Paralympic Committee (IPC) Paralympic Scientific Award in 2017.

== Early life and education ==
Tolfrey, inspired by her father, was an accomplished athlete and Charnwood Athletics Club member, holding the club's Heptathlon record since 1989. Tolfrey told Jim Al-Khalili that as a child she had dreamed of becoming an Olympian, Tolfrey studied a Sport Science degree at Manchester Metropolitan University, graduating with a 1st class degree and was awarded the Exercise and Sport Science Department's Department Prize for best all-round undergraduate prize in 1993. Her doctoral research focused on the physiology and propulsion technique of wheelchair racers, advocating for new technologies in the sport, while working part-time as a Research Assistant for the British Wheelchair Racing Association.

== Research and career ==
Tolfrey joined the staff at GB wheelchair basketball as a sport scientist. She joined the faculty at the Manchester Metropolitan University, where she spent four years before moving to Loughborough University.

Tolfrey is recognised by the British Association of Sport and Exercise Sciences. She started working with Paralympic athletes in 1994, and attended the 1996 Summer Paralympics, 2000 Summer Paralympics and the 2012 Summer Paralympics. She worked with the Great Britain Wheelchair Rugby Association, where she developed and oversaw and guided the applied sport programme for the 2016 Summer Paralympics Games. and Tokyo Paralympic 2020 Games where the team won gold. In 2024, Tolfrey and her team collaborated closely with wheelchair tennis (LTA) athletes focusing on optimising their wheelchairs for enhanced propulsion on the clay surface.

Tolfrey's recent key research initiatives that has moved Para sport forward include:

- Expanding female representation in wheelchair basketball research and aims to increase the participation of women in wheelchair rugby.
- Developing cooling strategies for wheelchair rugby, wheelchair tennis and paratriathlon.
- Advancing aerodynamics research for racing wheelchairs and increasing the wheelchair tennis knowledge of wheelchair set-ups.
- Classification research within the sports of Para Canoe, wheelchair basketball, wheelchair tennis and wheelchair rugby.
- Building international collaborations worldwide.

== Awards and honours ==
- 2005 BASES Award for Good Practice
- 2011 BASES Fellowship
- 2017 IPC Paralympic Scientific Award
- 2021 Canadian Society for Exercise Physiology Annual Health and Fitness Professionals Lecture
- 2024 BBC Radio 4 The Life Scientific
- 2024 BBC 2 University Challenge Christmas edition

== Selected publications ==
- Kathleen Martin Ginis; Jan W van der Scheer; Amy E Latimer-Cheung; et al. (25 October 2017). "Evidence-based scientific exercise guidelines for adults with spinal cord injury: an update and a new guideline". Spinal Cord. 56 (4): 308–321. doi:10.1038/s41393-017-0017-3. ISSN 1362-4393. PMID 29070812. Wikidata Q48127697.
- Jan W van der Scheer; Kathleen Martin Ginis; David S Ditor; Victoria L Goosey-Tolfrey; Audrey L Hicks; Christopher R West; Dalton L Wolfe (21 July 2017). "Effects of exercise on fitness and health of adults with spinal cord injury: A systematic review". Neurology. 89 (7): 736–745. doi:10.1212/wnl.0000000000004224. ISSN 1526-632X. PMID 28733344. Wikidata Q39451347.
- Barry S Mason; Lucas H V van der Woude; Victoria L Goosey-Tolfrey (1 January 2013). "The ergonomics of wheelchair configuration for optimal performance in the wheelchair court sports". Sports Medicine. 43 (1): 23–38. doi:10.1007/s40279-012-0005-x. ISSN 0112-1642. PMID 23315754. Wikidata Q38073739.
