= Haley Gomez =

Welsh Professor of Astrophysics

- Education: Cardiff University
- Known for: Cosmic dust
- Awards: MBE 2018
- Scientific career
- Workplaces: Cardiff University
- Thesis: Origin and evolution of dust (2004)
- Doctoral advisor: Mike Edmunds; Steve Eales

Haley Gomez (née Morgan) (born 1979) MBE, FRAS, FLSW is a Welsh Professor of Astrophysics at Cardiff University. She studies the formation and evolution of cosmic dust using the Herschel Space Observatory. She is Head of the School of Physics and Astronomy. She was awarded an Order of the British Empire in the 2018 Queen’s Birthday Honour’s.

== Early life and education ==
Gomez was born in Barry and educated in a state school. She earned an undergraduate degree at Cardiff University in 2001. She was the first in her family to go to university and was inspired by Vera Rubin. She stayed at Cardiff University for her postgraduate study, where she completed a PhD with Mike Edmunds and Steve Eales. Her PhD thesis "The Origin and Evolution of Dust", explored the origins of smoke-sized particles in space. She graduated in 2004 and was awarded the Royal Astronomical Society prize for the best UK doctoral thesis.

== Research and career ==
Gomez was awarded a Royal Commission for the Exhibition of 1851 Fellowship which allowed her to remain at Cardiff University. She presented her research to Prince Philip, Duke of Edinburgh at Buckingham Palace. She identified that supernovae could be factories of cosmic dust by using the James Clerk Maxwell Telescope to study cold dust grains. She was appointed as a lecturer in 2013, a senior lecturer in 2014 and a Professor in 2015. Her research considers how cosmic dust grains form in elliptical galaxies. She has used the Akari satellite to survey the sky in the mid-infrared and identify the building blocks of life. Gomez continued to use the data from the Herschel Space Observatory long after it stopped operating in 2013.

As Head of Public Engagement in the School of Physics at Cardiff University, Gomez coordinates the outreach activities for schools, teachers and the public. With the National Assembly for Wales Science Academy, Gomez ran Universe in a Classroom Universe in a Classroom hopes to reach 60,000 children over ten years, and has already trained teachers from 130 Welsh primary schools. They have a small robotic telescope, education resources and learning based activities. until its end in 2018. She has partnered with the European Inspiring Science Education which provides schools and teachers simulations and data analysis tools to learn physics. She gives regular public lectures and has been featured at the Royal Albert Hall and National Museum of Wales, as well as in the Sky at Night Magazine and Astronomy Now. She has worked with Sense about Science and appeared on science podcasts. She is on the committee of WISE Campaign Wales. She was a speaker at the 2015 TEDxCardiff, where she discussed the origins of life.

She was elected a Fellow of the Learned Society of Wales in 2017.

=== Awards and honours ===
- 2018 MBE
- 2015 Royal Astronomical Society Fowler Prize
- 2015 European Research Council Laureate
- 2014 Inspire Wales Award, Science and Technology Category
- 2005 Research fellowship from Royal Commission for the Exhibition of 1851
- 2005 Royal Astronomical Society Michael Penston prize for best UK thesis in Astronomy and Astrophysics
