= Jacinta Tan =

British psychiatrist

- Born: c. 1967; Singapore
- Education: Oxford University
- Alma mater: University of Oxford
- Children: 1
- Scientific career
- Fields: Psychiatry
- Workplaces: Oxford NHS Trust

Jacinta Tan (born c 1967) is a British consultant child and adolescent psychiatrist specialising in anorexia nervosa.

== Early life ==
She was born in Singapore, but is now a British subject. She went into medical school in Singapore but quickly left to read Philosophy and Psychology at Oxford University. She received a master's degree in child health at Warwick University and then she received her doctorate in sociology from Oxford University researching mental capacity in anorexia nervosa.

After her training in psychiatry, she analysed the basis and ethics on which one could assess the capacity of patients for making decisions about their own treatment. As a result of working in an ethics unit rather than psychiatric academic unit, she lost her Mental Health Officer status. After six years she found an academic post, during which time she worked unpaid. Until 2019 she was Clinical Associate Professor in the College of Medicine, Swansea University. She now works at Oxford Health NHS Foundation Trust and also runs the Welsh Government’s Eating Disorder National Service Review as part of her work at Aneurin Bevan University Health Board, and is now also doing the same for the Scottish Government. She is also a founder editor for the BioMed Central open access journal Child and Adolescent Psychiatry and Mental Health.

== Personal life ==
She had seven rounds of IVF to conceive her child. She has also had major surgery, breast cancer and has become visually disabled. She contracted long covid and is still recovering. She was interviewed for the BBC's The Life Scientific on 7 June 2022
