= Zoe Shipton =

British geologist

Zoe Kai Shipton is a British geologist who is a professor of Geological Engineering at the University of Strathclyde.

In July 2014, Shipton's career in geology was featured on the BBC Radio 4 show The Life Scientific.

== Early life ==
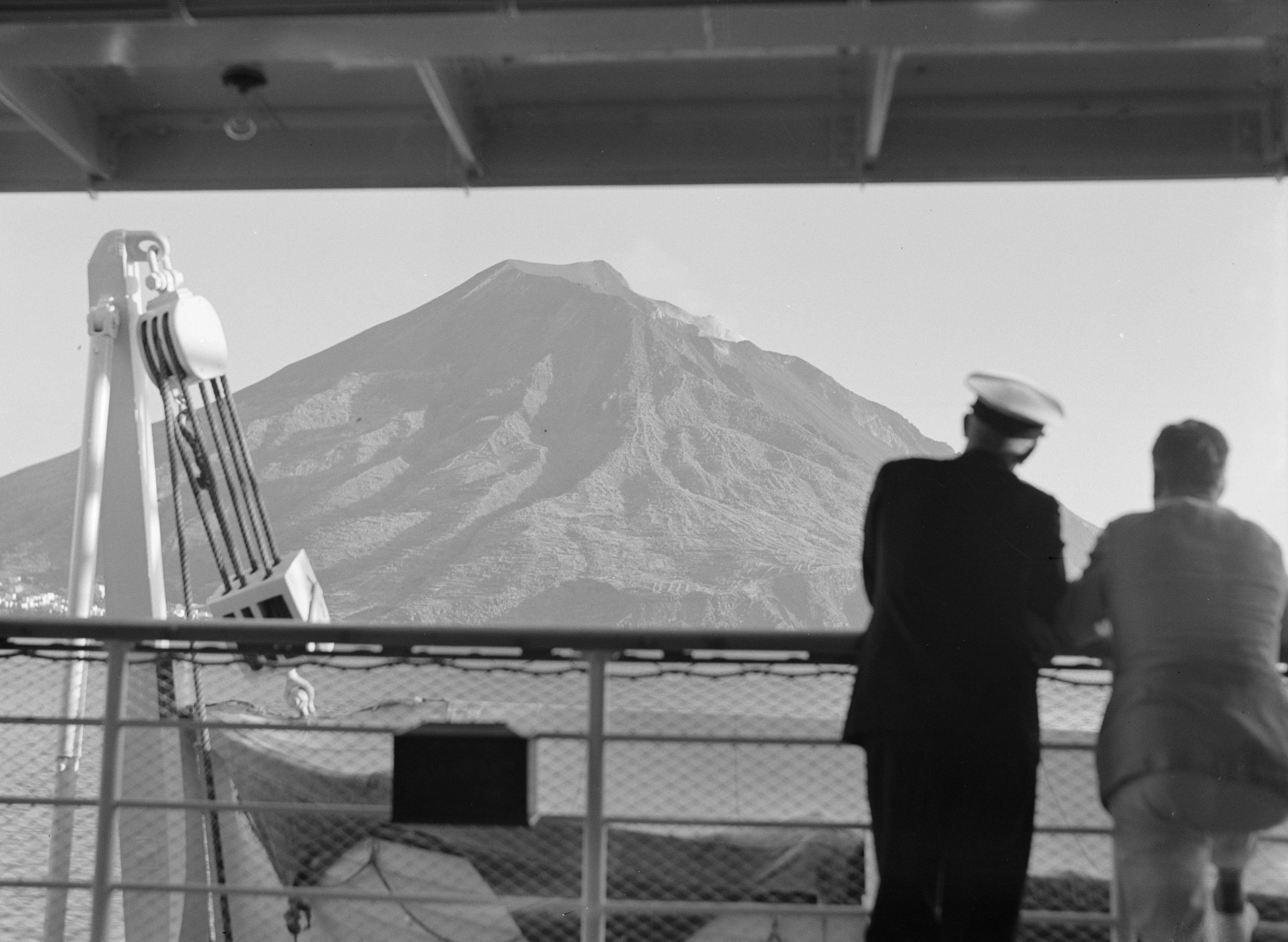
Stromboli Volcano

Shipton's affinity for geology began when she was a young child. Her parents gifted her an educational book on volcanoes in response to Shipton having dreams about the hill behind their home turning into one. At the age of 8 she went to the site of Stromboli, an active volcano in Italy, with her father, Nick — a time which Shipton claims was greatly influential in solidifying her interest in geology. Zoe's paternal grandfather was Himalayan mountaineer Eric Shipton. She initially entered the field due to her interest in the earth's geological history.

== Education and career ==
Shipton is a professor of geological engineering at the University of Strathclyde. Shipton specializes in structural geology, geological engineering, and geological uncertainty.

Shipton received a Bachelor of Science degree from the University of Leeds in January 1994, and she subsequently received a Doctorate in Philosophy from the University of Edinburgh in January 1999.

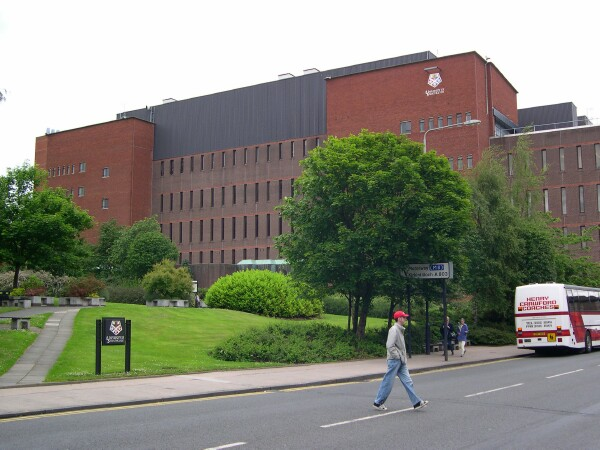
Currently a professor at the University of Strathclyde

For her PhD, Shipton studied geological faults and the way that fluid flows through them to better understand how faults initiate and grow. Her specialization lies in the research of faults; she has travelled to places such as Utah and Taiwan to conduct studies on earthquakes by drilling into the resulting ruptures. Shipton has spoken on the topic of earthquakes caused by fracking, both in the UK and the US, in an effort to better the public's understanding of the process.

Shipton is a member of the Royal Society and the Royal Academy of Engineering working group on “Shale gas extraction in the UK: a review of the scientific and engineering evidence”. In a report by the Royal Academy of Engineering, Shipton stated that, through careful procedures, fracking could be performed safely with little environmental detriment. Recently, Shipton has written of finding a more sustainable energy source for heating homes in the UK. In Scotland, Shipton and colleagues from the University of Strathclyde received funding to introduce and create detailed plans to make use of geothermal energy from abandoned and flooded coal mines in Scotland. The use of the trapped heat that Shipton tapped into could be used in home heating, generating jobs and income. Shipton is heavily involved in research quantifying geological uncertainties, further influencing more of her work into studies associated with risk and uncertainty of her associated specialty. Shipton was also the past chair of the Tectonic Studies Group of the Geological Society of London, a group based in London, UK, that researches structure and tectonics.

From 2007 to 2020, Shipton was active as a member or chair in seven different external organizations, including the Natural Environment Research Council (NERC), the Scottish Government, the Institute of Civil Engineering, the Tectonic Studies Group of the Geological Society of London, Sense About Science, and the Royal Society of Edinburgh.

Shipton has organized four special symposia:

- Geomechanical and Petrophysical Properties of Mudrocks: October 2015
- Communicating Contested Geoscience: June 2014
- Fault Zones: Structure, Geomechanics, and Fluid Flow: September 2008
- Tectonic Studies Group Annual Meeting: January 2007.

Zoe Shipton has a large network of projects and colleagues all over the globe with substantial projects included in countries such as the United States, China, Australia, South Africa, and multiple countries across Europe.

== Research and publications ==
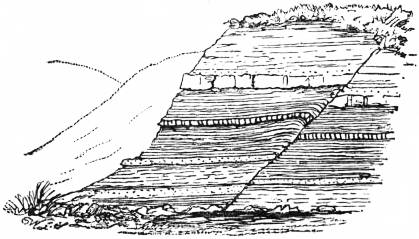
Diagram of Geological Fault Line

Shipton's research focuses on the structural and permeability architecture of faults, with four main areas of focus; how faults act as high permeability conduits, low permeability faults that produce hydrocarbon traps and barriers to fluid flow, understanding fault processes as tangible evidence that earthquakes are relative movements across fault zones, and how to constrain uncertainty in geological models. 24 PhD students have worked across these questions and projects for their theses as well as post-doctoral studies under Shipton.

Shipton has been published in several prominent geoscience journals, including Nature Energy, Tectonophysics, and The Journal of Structural Geology. While these works explore such topics as the connection between geologic faults and earthquake prediction, or the nature and control of fractures in different rock types, she has also written about teaching methods for communicating the value of uncertainty and flexibility in the development of geoscience knowledge. Shipton also discusses subjective bias in geological data gathered about fault lines. In “How do we see fractures?”, Shipton sets out a system of protocols to ensure the accurate collection of this data as it is often used in geological and predictive models. In “Interseasonal Compressed-air Storage Using Saline Aquifers” Shipton proposes the use of porous rock basins to hold large amounts of compressed gasses to store energy in a renewable energy system.

Shipton has published over 190 peer-reviewed research articles and papers, has been cited over 6200 times, and has an H-index of 41.

== Honours ==
In 2010, Shipton received the William Smith Fund award for excellence in contributions to applied and economic aspects of geoscience by an early-career geoscientist.

In March 2016, Shipton was elected a Fellow of the Royal Society of Edinburgh, Scotland's National Academy for science and letters.

She was appointed Officer of the Order of the British Empire (OBE) in the 2022 New Year Honours for services to geoscience and climate change mitigation.

In 2025 she was elected a Fellow of the Royal Academy of Engineering.
