= Charalambos Kyriacou =

British academic

Charalambos "Bambos" Kyriacou
- Born: 1953 (age 72–73); Camden, London, UK
- Education: University of Birmingham (BSc)
- Known for: Circadian rhythms Drosophila
- Awards: Royal Society Wolfson Research Merit Award (2003-8)
- Scientific career
- Fields: Behavioural Genetics
- Doctoral advisor: Kevin Connolly; Barrie Burnet
- Website: https://le.ac.uk/people/charalambos-kyriacou

Charalambos "Bambos" Kyriacou is Professor of Behavioural Genetics at the University of Leicester. He is a fellow of Academy of Medical Sciences (United Kingdom). In 2022 he was a guest on The Life Scientific on BBC Radio 4.

== Education ==
Kyriacou received a bachelor's degree in psychology from the University of Birmingham in 1973.
