= Anne-Marie Imafidon =

British child prodigy and STEM activist (born 1990)

Anne-Marie Imafidon MBE HonFREng
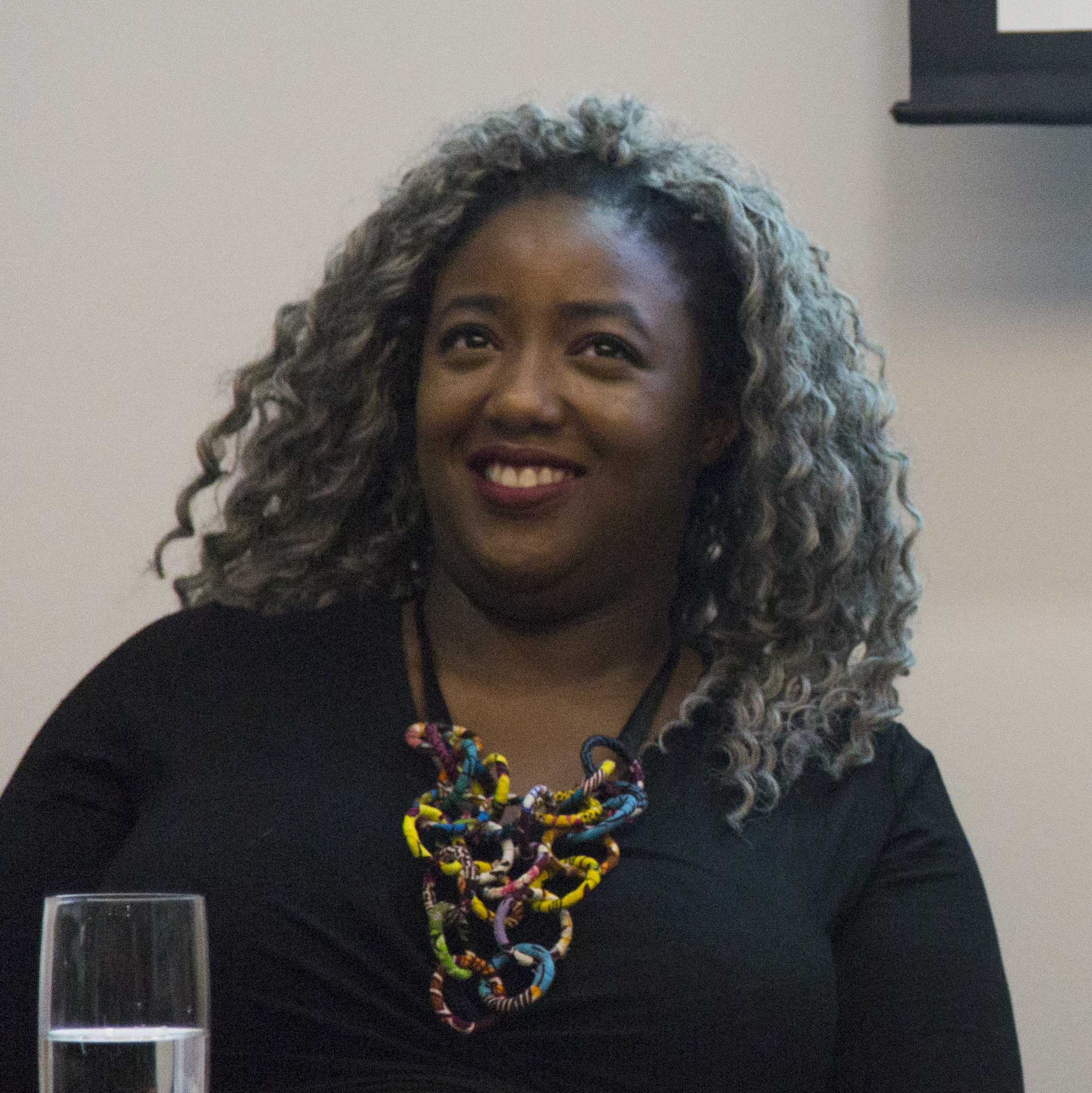
- Imafidon in 2018
- Born: Anne-Marie Osawemwenze Ore-Ofe Imafidon; 27 July 1990 (age 36); Barking, London, England
- Education: University of Oxford (MMathCompSci)
- Known for: Stemettes
- Awards: Suffrage Science award (2020)
- Scientific career
- Fields: Mathematics; Computer science; Social enterprise
- Workplaces: Stemettes; Hewlett-Packard; Deutsche Bank
- Imafidon's voice recorded March 2019
- Website: www.aimafidon.com

Anne-Marie Osawemwenze Ore-Ofe Imafidon (pronounced: /ɪmˈæfɪdən/, i-MA-fi-dən; born 27 July 1990) is a British-Nigerian social entrepreneur and computer scientist. She founded and became CEO of Stemettes in 2013, a social enterprise promoting women in STEM careers. In June 2022, she was announced as the 2022–2023 President of the British Science Association. She has worked for companies such as Hewlett-Packard and Deutsche Bank. She has spoken at many international conferences such as the Web Summit, SXSW, and the Women of the World Festival. She is also a member of the Advisory Board of the Girl Guides and the Council of Digital Economy as well as the trustee of the Institute for the Future of Work. As of February 2024, she is the Chancellor (titular head) of Glasgow Caledonian University.

== Early life and education ==
Imafidon was born in the UK in 1990 and grew up in Walthamstow, east London. She is the eldest of five siblings. Her father is Chris Imafidon. At the age of 11 she was the youngest girl to pass A-level computing, gaining an E. She obtained her undergraduate master's degree in mathematics and computer science from the University of Oxford at 20 years old.

== Stemettes and entrepreneurship ==
Imafidon is the co-founder of Stemettes, a social initiative promoting and inspiring women in STEM. Since its founding in 2013, the organization has expanded significantly, reaching over 65,000 young people and non-binary individuals across Europe through targeted hackathons, certification programs, and mentoring networks. Imafidon decided to create Stemettes after attending a STEM workshop organized by Business in the Community. She came to understanding that there is a prevailing issue of a lack of women and non-binary people in STEM. Imafidon emphasizes the importance of having not only diversity in STEM but in all industries. Stemettes' mission is to engage, inform and connect, young women and non binary people into STEM. Stemettes' values itself as an organization that is inclusive and strives to center around the youth. She recently in 2022 launched her guidebook for women in STEM called She's in CTRL.

== Other work ==
In 2019, Imafidon hosted the Women Tech Charge podcast for the Evening Standard, in which she conducted interviews with tech figures such as Jack Dorsey, and other celebrities such as Rachel Riley and Lewis Hamilton.

She is a trustee of the Institute for the Future of Work, which researches ways to improve work and working lives. She is a member of the council at the Royal College of Art and at Research England, a member of the British Library's advisory council. Anne-Marie is also a member of the Digital, Culture, Media and Sports' Digital Skills Partnership Board.

In September 2021, Imafidon co-hosted a special episode of Channel 4's Countdown – broadcast for the channel's Black to Front Day campaign as arithmetician. She reprised the role later that year – standing in on 60 episodes for Rachel Riley while she was on maternity leave, and has reprised the role on 8 Out of 10 Cats Does Countdown.

In December 2022, Imafidon guest-edited BBC Radio 4's Today programme.

In 2022, she was announced by the British Science Association as that organisation's president for the year 2022–2023.

In June 2023, Imafidon was interviewed by Jim Al-Khalili for The Life Scientific podcast, discussing diversity and equality in science, recorded at the Cheltenham Arts Festival.

In the week beginning 22 January 2024, Imafidon was a contestant on the BBC Two game show Richard Osman‘s House of Games, finishing second behind comedian Leo Reich, but ahead of broadcaster Craig Doyle and former Paralympian Tanni Grey-Thompson, having won the Thursday episode.

== Recognition ==
In 2017, Imafidon became an Honorary Fellow at Keble College, Oxford, and was appointed a Member of the Order of the British Empire (MBE) in the New Year Honours for her services to young women and STEM sectors. In 2020, she was voted the UK's most influential woman in tech by Computer Weekly and received the Suffrage Science Award. In 2023, Imafidon was awarded an Honorary Doctorate by Royal Holloway, University of London, followed by an honorary Doctorate of Science from the University of Bath.

In March 2026, she was named the global recipient of the annual Power of Radiance Awards by Clé de Peau Beauté, recognizing her advocacy for expanding non-binary and girls' access to STEAM fields through immersive grant-backed programs.

== Honorary degrees ==
Imafidon has been awarded numerous honorary doctorates in recognition of her contributions to computer science, mathematics, and diversity advocacy:

- 2023: Honorary Doctorate from Royal Holloway, University of London
- 2024: Honorary Doctorate of Science from the University of Bath
- 2024: Honorary Doctor of Science from Durham University during Summer Congregation
- 2024: Honorary Doctorate of Science from the University of Leicester

She also holds honorary academic distinctions from the Open University, Glasgow Caledonian University, University of Kent, University of Bristol, and Coventry University.
