= Bahija Jallal =

Businessperson, Chief Executive Officer and Director of the Board at Immunocore

- Born: May 8, 1961 (age 65); Morocco

Academic background
- Education: Université de Paris VI
- Thesis: Recepteurs de la lh dans le testicule de porcelet : purification, caracterisation et obtention d'anticorps monoclonaux (1989)

Bahija Jallal (born May 8, 1961) is chief executive officer and director of the board of Immunocore. She has previously been president at MedImmune and AstraZeneca. She is a council member of the Government–University–Industry Research Roundtable of the National Academies of Sciences, Engineering and Medicine.

== Early life and education ==
Jallal grew up in Morocco. She was one of seven children, and her mother raised them alone because her father died at an early age. She became interested in science, first earning doctorate studies in physiology at the Université de Paris VI. She was a postdoctoral researcher in molecular biology and oncology at the Max Planck Institute for Biochemistry.

== Research and care ==
Jallal moved to the United States and moved into the biotechnology industry. She first joined SUGEN, where she worked on small-molecule anticancer kinase inhibitors. In the early 2000s she started working on monoclonal antibodies, at Chiron Corporation and MedImmune. At Chiron she was made Vice President of Drug Development, and developed a translational medicine focus group.

In 2019 Jallal was appointed chief executive of Immunocore, who focus on T-cell receptors for cellular therapies. Other cellular therapeutic companies were engineering T-cell receptors on T cells ex vivo, Immunocore identified a strategy to use TCRs for soluble biologics. Immunocore raised $320m of initial series A support, and Jallal was made responsible securing further funding. TCRs offer a strategy to redirect T cells into tumours. Immunocore have developed anti-cancer immune mobilising monoclonal TCRs (ImmTACs), which are bispecific (have two bioactive ends). One end is designed to have an affinity to a particular antigenic determinant, and uses antigens to turn them into anti-cancer tools. The other antigen has an Anti-CD3 monoclonal antibody to engage with circulating polyclonal T cells. This means they can recruit any CD3-positive T cells to a tumour. Their ImmTACs can be expressed by escherichia coli, which makes them simple and cheap to scale. In addition to fighting cancer, the CD3-binding functionality offers promise for using the immune system to fight infectious diseases, and modifying the effector function offers hope of treating autoimmune disease.

In 2023 Jallal featured alongside Jim Al-Khalili on The Life Scientific.

== Awards and honours ==
- 2017 Healthcare Businesswomen's Association Woman of the Year
- 2017 President of the Association of Women in Science

== Select publications ==
- C Wallasch; F U Weiss; G Niederfellner; B Jallal; W Issing; A Ullrich (1995). "Heregulin-dependent regulation of HER2/neu oncogenic signaling by heterodimerization with HER3". The EMBO Journal. 14 (17): 4267–75. PMC 394510. PMID 7556068. Wikidata Q24309266.
- Higgs, Brandon; Zheng Liu; Barbara White; et al. (2011). "Patients with systemic lupus erythematosus, myositis, rheumatoid arthritis and scleroderma share activation of a common type I interferon pathway". Annals of the Rheumatic Diseases. 70 (11): 2029–2036. doi:10.1136/ard.2011.150326. PMID 21803750. Wikidata Q84626226.
- Yihong Yao; Laura Richman; Chris Morehouse; Melissa de los Reyes; Higgs, Brandon; Anmarie Boutrin; Barbara White; Coyle, Anthony; James Krueger; Kiener, Peter; Bahija Jallal (2008). "Type I interferon: potential therapeutic target for psoriasis?". PLOS One. 3 (7) e2737. Bibcode:2008PLoSO...3.2737Y. doi:10.1371/journal.pone.0002737. PMC 2481274. PMID 18648529. Wikidata Q33354097.
