= Chris Elliott (food scientist) =

Professor of food security at Queen's University Belfast

- Known for: ecologist
- Scientific career
- Fields: Food safety

Christopher Elliott is a Professor Emeritus of Food Safety and Microbiology at Queen's University Belfast and founder of the university's Institute for Global Food Security. He led the independent review of the UK food system after the 2013 horse meat scandal.

== Early life and education ==
Christopher Trevor Elliott grew up in Northern Ireland, initially in Belfast and then moved with his family to his grandparents’ farm where he enjoyed working and gained experience with farm animals. He left school at 16 with few qualifications. He got a job as a laboratory assistant at a government research institute that encouraged staff to improve their knowledge. After several years of part-time and evening study he was able to enroll for a degree in medical biological sciences at Ulster University. He later gained a PhD for his work on developing tests for the illegal use of growth promoting drugs in farm animals, and implementing a monitoring programme.

== Career ==
Elliott initially worked in a government institute that undertook research into animal health and behaviour. Starting at a very low level, he was promoted into roles involving virology and later veterinary testing. He reached the position of Principle Scientific Officer when he was 35. His doctoral work on testing and monitoring for the illegal use of clenbuterol as a growth promotor in animal husbandry developed into a system that was used worldwide. In around 2000, he moved to Queen's University Belfast to develop a food and agricultural science department. By 2013 he had persuaded the university to form an Institute of Global Food Security, the first with this name in the British Isles, and became its first director.

After the 2008 Irish pork crisis, where dioxin contamination of pig meat led to an international product recall, he led the Food Fortress project, at the request of the animal feed industry, to evaluate future risks and develop testing and monitoring so that it would not be repeated. This developed into a sampling programme of feed mills that continued into the early 2020s.

He led the British government's independent review of food systems following the 2013 horse meat scandal, with his review and recommendations published in 2014. This led to establishment of a National Food Crime Unit within the Food Standards Agency in 2015 supported by industry as well as government.

Elliott has led development of the concept of a molecular fingerprint for each unadulterated food material or product. This uses infra-red molecular spectroscopy and mass spectrometry. The size of portable testing machines has been miniaturised so that testing can take place on site. The result is that the presence or absence of an adulterant can be established with high confidence, and its nature can be established later.

He is a visiting professor at the Chinese Agriculture University in Beijing.

Since retiring he has taken up a role with a university in Thailand to build resilience to climate change into local food production. He also supports a number of different UN Agencies on projects relating to food security, food safety and food authenticity in a large number of Developing Countries.

Elliott is also the co-founder and President of BIA-Analytical. A technology company headquartered In Belfast which delivers solutions to the food industry and regulatory organizations in many aspects of safety, authenticity and quality.

== Awards and honours ==
He is a recipient of a Winston Churchill Fellowship and is an elected Fellow of the Royal Society of Chemistry and the Royal Society of Biology. In 2017 he was awarded the Royal Society of Chemistry Theophilus Redwood Prize, appointed an OBE in The Queen's 2017 Birthday Honours and was given an award for Outstanding Contribution to the Northern Ireland Food Industry by the Northern Ireland Food and Drink Association. He is a member of the Chinese Academy of Sciences. In 2015 he received an award from the BBC Food and Farming awards. In May 2020 he became a member of the Royal Irish Academy. In 2022 he was the guest on the BBC Radio 4 programme The Life Scientific. . Chris is a Vice President of the Chartered Institute for Environmental Health and Honorary President of the Society of Food Hygiene and Technology.

== Personal life ==
Elliott is married with two children and three grandchildren. With friends, he founded the cross-community Antrim Rovers football club which now has teams for children, seniors, men and women.

== Publications ==
Elliott is the author or co-author of over 600 scientific papers as well as official reports and reviews.
