= Amoret Whitaker =

Entomologist

- Education: Reading University
- Occupation: Forensic entomologist
- Employer: University of Winchester
- Amoret Whitaker's voice Recorded January 2013 from the BBC Radio 4 programme The Life Scientific
- Website: www.winchester.ac.uk/academicdepartments/applied-social-sciences/PeopleProfiles/Pages/DrAmoretWhitaker.aspx

Amoret Whitaker is a forensic entomologist in the UK.

== Education ==
She studied a BSc in zoology at Reading University, a master's of taxonomy and biodiversity at Imperial College London and the Natural History Museum, London and a PhD in forensic entomology at King's College London.

== Career and research ==
Amoret's early research was into fleas, which are her favourite insects. She wrote the Fleas (Siphonaptera) volume of the Handbooks for the identification of British Insects, published in 2007 by the Royal Entomological Society and is currently writing Flea for the Reaktion Books Animal series.

She moved in forensic entomology and regularly carries out casework with police forces in the UK using insect evidence to determine the post mortem interval of a body. The first case she worked on was the Murder of Shafilea Ahmed.

Her research looks at the development and behaviour of blowflies and beetles under different environmental conditions, she is based at the Natural History Museum in London where she is a Scientific Associate, at the body farm in Tennessee and at the University of Winchester where she is a senior lecturer in forensic studies.

== Media and public appearances ==
In 2013 she was interviewed by Jim Al-Khalili on the BBC's The Life Scientific programme, in 2017 she appeared on The Infinite Monkey Cage's episode about insects. She was the Verrall Lecturer for the Royal Entomological Society in 2018, speaking on Fabulous Fleas. She appeared as part of a team for Reading University in the Christmas University Challenge 2020
