= Stemettes =

Social enterprise

- Industry: STEM
- Founded: 2013
- Founders: Anne-Marie Imafidon
- Headquarters: London, United Kingdom
- Products: Stemettes Events, Stemettes Mentoring Programme, Stemette Society
- Website: stemettes.org

Stemettes is a social enterprise working to engage and champion girls, young women, and non-binary people 5–25 to pursue careers in Science, Technology, Engineering, and Maths (STEM) and STEAM. Stemettes run various free programmes, events, and interventions as well as a closed online platform, the Stemettes Society, for girls, young women and non-binary people interested in STEM and entrepreneurship. The enterprise works closely with STEM & STEAM partners and volunteers, as well as supporting Teachers, educators, parents, and guardians. Outside of these interventions, Stemettes take part in regular advocacy work and work alongside their charitable arm, Stemette Futures.

== Programmes & Events ==
Supporting over 75,000 girls, young women and non-binary people since 2013, Stemettes programmes run regularly, relying on their partners and volunteers. As of 2026, their programmes and events are as follows

- Themed Challenges: Where attendees spend a day problem solving around a real world topic using tech tools. For example, a sustainability challenge might see attendees 3D sculpt a solar powered product, and then showcase this product to a panel of judges.
- Panel events: Here, attendees can speed network with role models and peers as well as taking part in a Q&A and panel with industry professionals.
- Stemettes Career Essentials Courses: A one-day to three-day course where attendees will gain a skill in an area of STEAM Leadership and career development.
- Certified With Stemettes: A three-day academy style event where attendees get an industry-recognised certification in skills such as Cybersecurity, Python, or Agile.
- Stemettes Offsite: These events are designed to bring careers education to life, connecting students with real professionals working across STEAM, focused around a certain theme and in a real STEAM environment.
- The Stemillions Club: Aimed at teachers looking to enrich their STEM & STEAM classroom learning, these STEAM clubs aim to introduce students to female role models in STEAM & show them how fun STEAM can be.
- Stemettes Supply Sessions: These events include Stemettes staff visiting a school to spend a morning working with students to solve different STEM & STEAM challenges, with the opportunity to win prizes.
- Stemettes Discovery Days: One day events for attendees to explore a number of different STEAM topics and activities.
- Stemettes Mentoring Programme: A four-month programme where mentees will have 1:1 access with a mentor from STEAM industry as well as networking opportunities and CV/LinkedIn building workshops.

== History ==
Stemettes was started in 2013 by British mathematics and computing child prodigy Anne-Marie Imafidon , after attending a keynote speech at the Grace Hopper Celebration of Women in Computing the previous year.

Stemettes partners with organisations including Mercedes-Benz AMG PETRONAS, Deutsche Bank, GSK, G-Research, Siemens Energy, Salesforce, Accenture,and Microsoft. The award-winning organisation is regularly called upon by the UK Government and European Commission to consult on matters related to women in STEM.

== Awards and recognition ==
Stemettes was named as European Digital Impact Organisation of the Year in October 2014 by the Digital Leadership Institute.
