= Sonia Gandhi (scientist) =

British physician and neuroscientist

- Education: University of Cambridge; University of Oxford; University College London
- Scientific career
- Fields: Protein misfolding Neurodegeneration; Parkinson's disease
- Workplaces: University College London; Francis Crick Institute; Imperial College London
- Thesis: The role of PINK1 in Parkinson's disease (2009)
- Website: www.crick.ac.uk/research/find-a-researcher/sonia-gandhi

Sonia Gandhi is a British physician and neuroscientist who leads the Francis Crick Institute neurodegeneration laboratory. She holds a joint position at the UCL Queen Square Institute of Neurology. Her research investigates the molecular mechanisms that give rise to Parkinson's disease. During the COVID-19 pandemic, Gandhi was involved with the epidemiological investigations and testing efforts at the Francis Crick Institute.

== Early life and education ==
Gandhi studied neuroscience at Trinity College, Cambridge, and earned her bachelor's degree in 1996. She moved to the University of Oxford to complete a Bachelor of Medicine, Bachelor of Surgery (BM BCh) degree in medicine. She was a trainee neurologist at the Hammersmith Hospital, National Hospital for Neurology and Neurosurgery and Whittington Hospital. In 2004 she was awarded a Wellcome Trust fellowship to work toward a doctoral degree in neuroscience at the UCL Queen Square Institute of Neurology, and completed her PhD in 2009.

== Research and career ==
She was awarded a National Institute for Health Research (NIHR) lectureship at Imperial College London in 2009. In 2012 she was awarded a Wellcome Trust intermediate clinical fellowship to study the misfolding of alpha-synuclein in Parkinson's disease, and how this misfolding causes neurotoxicity. Gandhi established her laboratory at the UCL Queen Square Institute of Neurology in 2013. Her research group develop human-derived induced pluripotent stem cell (iPSC) models of disease, with a focus on understanding how the aggregation of alpha-synuclein, a protein encoded by the SNCA gene, impacts cell physiology. She makes use of single-molecule FRET and mitochondrial physiology to study the behaviour of alpha-synuclein at the molecular level.

In 2016 Gandhi was awarded a secondment at the Francis Crick Institute. Gandhi and co-workers showed that clumps of alpha-synuclein can be toxic to neural function, damaging proteins on the surface of mitochondria. This damage forced a channel on mitochondria to open and made them less efficient in their production of energy, causing them to swell and leak essential chemicals – eventually causing the cell to die. To perform the experiments, Gandhi and colleagues turned human skin cells into stem cells, which were converted into brain cells that could be investigated into the laboratory. She was part of a team who investigated the use of exenatide as a means to slow the progression of multiple system atrophy. In February 2020 Gandhi was awarded a Medical Research Council (MRC) clinical fellowship to study the fundamental origins of Parkinson's disease.

During the COVID-19 pandemic, Gandhi studied the epidemiology of coronavirus disease. In particular, Gandhi was interested in how the virus evolved throughout the course of the pandemic, how it impacted the nervous system and how it was transmitted between people. She was also involved with the COVID-19 testing that took place at the Francis Crick Institute.

In 2026, she was elected a Fellow of the Academy of Medical Sciences.

=== Selected publications ===
Gandhi's publications include:

- A common LRRK2 mutation in idiopathic Parkinson's disease
- Mechanism of Oxidative Stress in Neurodegeneration
- PINK1-Associated Parkinson's Disease Is Caused by Neuronal Vulnerability to Calcium-Induced Cell Death
