= Kathleen Martin Ginis =

Canadian exercise behavioural scientist

- Born: June 9, 1968 (age 58); Toronto
- Spouse: Speros Ginis
- Children: Athena Ginis

Academic background
- Education: BSc, Psychology, University of Toronto; MA, PhD, Kinesiology, University of Waterloo

Kathleen Anne Martin Ginis (née Kathleen Anne Martin; born June 9, 1968) is a Canadian exercise behavioural scientist. She is a Full professor in the Department of Medicine and in the School of Health and Exercise Sciences at the University of British Columbia. She also holds the Reichwald Family UBC Southern Medical Program Chair in Preventive Medicine. She is a Fellow of the Royal Society of Canada and the Canadian Academy of Health Sciences.

== Early life and education ==
Martin Ginis was born on June 9, 1968. She completed her Bachelor of Science degree in Psychology at the University of Toronto her Master's degree in Kinesiology at The University of Western Ontario and PhD in Kinesiology at the University of Waterloo. Following this, Martin Ginis finished her postdoctoral training at Wake Forest University.

== Career ==
=== McMaster University ===
Upon completing her PhD and postdoctoral training, Martin Ginis became an assistant professor in the Department of Kinesiology at McMaster University in 1999 before being promoted to associate professor with tenure in 2002. As an associate professor, Martin Ginis led a study which found that mirrors and reflective surfaces may make some women feel worse after their workouts. Her research team studied 58 university women who normally participated in less than one moderate or strenuous forms of exercise each week and interviewed them about their body image and their feelings before and after working out. The conclusion of their study found that women who exercised in front of a mirror felt less energized, less relaxed and less positive and upbeat than women who worked out without a mirror. Three years later, Martin Ginis was the lead investigator in the Study of Health and Activity in People with Spinal Cord Injury (SHAPE-SCI), the largest study ever to determine whether physical activity is related to better health and quality of life for those with spinal cord injuries (SPI).

In 2007 Martin Ginis was awarded a $1 million grant from the Social Sciences and Humanities Research Council (SSHRC) to fund the Community University Research Alliance to Promote Physical Activity in People Living with SCI (CURA) in order to improve the physical and psychological well-being of those with spinal cord injuries. In 2014, Martin Ginis and former chancellor Melvin M. Hawkrigg were the only McMaster recipients of the Ontario Medal for Good Citizenship for their "exceptional, long-term contributions to the well-being of their communities."

=== UBC ===
Martin Ginis joined the School of Health and Exercise Sciences at the University of British Columbia (UBC) in July 2016. In her first year as a professor of health and exercise sciences, Martin Ginis collaborated with doctoral student Matthew Stork to study the attitudes of moderate exercisers towards high-intensity interval training (HIIT). They found that the moderate exercisers had a positive view towards HIIT if they listened to music while they exercised. Following this, she was appointed a UBC Distinguished University Scholar as someone who has "distinguished themselves as scholars in research and/or teaching and learning, or who have the potential to demonstrate such leadership." In this new role, she accepted a position in the Faculty of Medicine and was the founding director of the Centre for Chronic Disease Prevention and Management which aimed at being "responsive to the healthcare needs of our region’s communities both urban and rural and advance the international research field." She also worked with an international team to create additional guidelines to one she created in 2011. Her research team recommended 30 minutes of moderate to vigorous-intensity aerobic exercise three times a week for those with spinal injuries in contrast with 150 minutes of cardiovascular exercise every week for others as suggested by the World Health Organization.

During the COVID-19 pandemic in British Columbia, Martin Ginis and her team revitalized the Get in Motion program in order to encourage physical activity in people with disabilities. The program offered a virtual, at-home physical activity in order to encourage movement. She later collaborated with researchers in Ontario to launch a national COVID-19 disability survey as part of the Access Project "to fully understand the scope and complexity of these challenges as the pandemic continues for the foreseeable future." In 2023, Martin Ginis was named a Fellow of the Royal Society of Canada.

== Personal life ==
Martin Ginis is married and has one daughter. She is also an avid runner and traveller.
