= Mike Edmunds =

British astrophysicist

- Born: Michael G. Edmunds; 1949 (age 76–77); Dewsbury, Yorkshire, UK
- Education: University of Cambridge
- Known for: Origins of interstellar dust; Antikythera Mechanism Research Project
- Awards: George Darwin Lectureship (2005)
- Scientific career
- Fields: Astrophysics,
- Workplaces: Emeritus Professor of the Cardiff University

Michael G. Edmunds, FAS FInstP FLSW is a British astrophysicist, known for his research on the interpretation of the chemical composition of the Universe and the origin of interstellar dust.

== Early life ==
He was born in Dewsbury, Yorkshire, UK in 1949. His father’s job with the railways took him to many locations in the UK, so Edmunds grew up in several locations, moving with his parents. When Edmunds was 12, his family settled in Woking, Surrey, where he started at the local grammar school.

== Education ==
He received his undergraduate degree in physics in summer 1971 and proceeded to gain his doctorate, also from the University of Cambridge.

== Career ==
He has lived and worked in Wales for over 45 years, having settled there after receiving his doctorate in Cambridge, England.

He is an Emeritus Professor and former Head of the School of Physics and Astronomy at Cardiff University in Wales. He has served on many committees and panels of the UK Research Councils, The Royal Astronomical Society and the Institute of Physics. He was formerly a member of the Particle Physics and Astronomy Research Council. In 2015, he was elected a Fellow of the Learned Society of Wales.

Beginning in May 2022, he was appointed as chair of Royal Astronomical Society for a two year term.

=== Research ===
His main areas of research have been in the determination and interpretation of the chemical composition of galaxies and the Universe. He has also worked on the origin of interstellar dust. In later years, he has focused on the history of astronomy and science within society.

=== Antikythera Mechanism Research Project ===
He heads the Antikythera Mechanism Research Project: an international collaboration investigating the extraordinary astronomical machine dating from around the 200 BC, discovered by sponge divers over a century ago, off the Greek island of Antikythera. He discussed this with Jim Al-Khalili when he was a guest on the BBC Radio 4 programme The Life Scientific in 2024, and later in the year discussed the mechanism on In Our Time.
