= Australian Marine Mammal Research Centre =

Coordinates: 42°59′12″S 147°17′31″E

The Australian Marine Mammal Research Centre or AMMRC was established in 1996 as a co-operative centre of the University of Sydney and the Zoological Parks Board of New South Wales.

The centre's research program includes the impacts of climate change, the spatial, haul-out and foraging behaviour of leopard seals, population monitoring of Antarctic marine mammals, and the development of non-invasive techniques that will allow researchers to monitor the hormones of wild populations (whales, dolphins and seals) without having to restrain the animals.

The researchers, behavioural ecologists and veterinarians, work on projects including:

- Seals of the Antarctic pack ice,
- Cetaceans in the coastal waters of New Guinea,
- Seal and cetacean populations in Australian waters,
- Comparing southern and northern hemisphere endangered populations of cetaceans.

The research is supported by such organisations as the (Australian) Defence Science and Technology Organisation (DSTO).

== See also ==
- Australian Marine Conservation Society
