= Priority effect =

Ecological effect of a species arriving first at a site

In ecology, a priority effect refers to the impact that a particular species can have on community development as a result of its prior arrival at a site. There are two basic types of priority effects: inhibitory and facilitative. An inhibitory priority effect occurs when a species that arrives first at a site negatively affects a species that arrives later by reducing the availability of space or resources. In contrast, a facilitative priority effect occurs when a species that arrives first at a site alters abiotic or biotic conditions in ways that positively affect a species that arrives later. Inhibitory priority effects have been documented more frequently than facilitative priority effects. Studies indicate that both abiotic (e.g., resource availability) and biotic (e.g., predation) factors can affect the strength of priority effects. . Priority effects are a central and pervasive element of ecological community development that have significant implications for natural systems and ecological restoration efforts.

== Theoretical foundation ==
=== Community succession theory ===
Early in the 20th century, Frederic Clements and other plant ecologists suggested that ecological communities develop in a linear, directional manner towards a final, stable endpoint: the climax community. Clements indicated that a site's climax community would reflect local climate. He conceptualized the climax community as a "superorganism" that followed a defined developmental sequence.

Early ecological succession theory maintained that the directional shifts from one stage of succession to the next were induced by the plants themselves. In this sense, succession theory implicitly recognized priority effects; the prior arrival of certain species had important impacts on future community composition. At the same time, the climax concept implied that species shifts were predetermined. This implies that a given species would always appear at the same point during the development of the climax community and have a predictable impact on community development.

This static view of priority effects remained essentially unchanged by the concept of patch dynamics, introduced by Alex Watt in 1947. Watt conceived of plant communities as dynamic "mechanisms" that followed predetermined succession cycles. He viewed succession as a process driven by facilitation, in which each species made local conditions more suitable for another species.

=== Individualistic approach ===
In 1926, Henry Gleason presented an alternative hypothesis in which plants were conceptualized as individuals rather than components of a superorganism. This hypothesis suggested that the distribution of various species across the landscape reflected species-specific dispersal limitations and environmental requirements rather than predetermined associations among species. Gleason contested the idea of a predetermined climax community, recognizing that different colonizing species could produce alternative trajectories of community development. For example, initially identical ponds colonized by different species could develop through succession into very different communities.

The Initial Floristic Composition model was put forward by Frank Egler to describe community development in abandoned agricultural fields. According to this model, the set of species present in a field immediately after abandonment had strong influences on community development and final community composition.

=== Alternative stable states ===
In the 1970s, it was suggested that natural communities could be characterized by multiple or alternative stable states. Multiple stable state models suggested that the same environment could support several combinations of species. Theorists argued that historical context could play a central role in determining which stable state would be present at any given time. Robert May explained, "If there is a unique stable state, historical accidents are unimportant; if there are many alternative locally stable states, historical accidents can be of overriding significance."

=== Community assembly theory ===
Assembly theory explains community development processes in the context of multiple stable states: it asks why a particular type of community developed when other stable community types are possible. In contrast to succession theory, assembly theory was developed largely by animal ecologists and explicitly incorporated historical context.

In 1975, Jared Diamond developed quantitative "assembly rules" to predict avian community composition on an archipelago. This approach emphasizes historical contingency and multiple stable states. Although the idea of deterministic community assembly initially drew criticism, the approach continued to gain support. In 1991, Drake used an assembly model to demonstrate that different community types result from different sequences of species invasions. In this model, early invaders have major impacts on the invasion success of species that arrive later. Other modelling studies suggested that priority effects may be especially important when invasion frequency is low enough to allow species to become established before replacement, or when other factors that could drive assembly (e.g., competition, abiotic stress) are relatively unimportant.

In a 1999 review, Belyea and Lancaster described three basic determinants of community assembly: dispersal constraints, environmental constraints, and internal dynamics. They identified priority effects as a manifestation of the interaction between dispersal constraints and internal dynamics.

== Empirical evidence ==
Although early research focused on animals and aquatic systems, more recent studies have begun to examine terrestrial and plant-based priority effects.

=== Marine ===
Most of the earliest empirical evidence for priority effects came from studies on aquatic animals. Sutherland (1974) found that final community composition varied depending on the initial order of larval recruitment in a community of small marine organisms (sponges, tunicates, hydroids, and other species). Shulman (1983) found strong priority effects among coral reef fish. The study found that prior establishment by a territorial damselfish reduced establishment rates of other fish. The authors also identified cross-trophic priority effects; prior establishment by a predator fish reduced establishment rates of prey fishes.

In the late 1980s, several studies examined priority effects in marine microcosms. Robinson and Dickerson (1987) found that priority effects were important in some cases, but suggested, "Being the first to invade a habitat does not guarantee success; there must be sufficient time for the early colonist to increase its population size for it to pre-empt further colonization." Robinson and Edgemon (1988) later developed 54 communities of phytoplankton species by varying invasion order, rate, and timing. They found that although invasion order (priority effects) could explain a small fraction of the resulting variation in community composition, most of the variation was explained by changes in invasion rate and invasion timing. These studies indicate that priority effects may not be the only or the most important historical factor affecting the trajectory of community development.

In a striking example of cross-trophic priority effects, Hart (1992) found that priority effects explain the maintenance of two alternate stable states in stream ecosystems. While a macroalga is dominant in some patches, sessile grazers maintain a "lawn" of small microalgae in others. If the sessile grazers colonize a patch first, they exclude the macroalga, and vice versa.

=== Amphibian ===
In two of the most commonly cited empirical studies on priority effects, Alford and Wilbur documented inhibitory and facilitative priority effects among toad larvae in experimental ponds. They found that hatchlings of a toad species (Bufo americanus) exhibited higher growth and survivorship when introduced to a pond before those of a frog species (Rana sphenocephala). The frog larvae, however, did best when introduced after the toad larvae. Thus, prior establishment by the toad species facilitated the frog species, while prior establishment by the frog species inhibited the toad species. Studies on tree frogs have also documented both types of priority effects. Morin (1987) also observed that priority effects became less important in the presence of a predatory salamander. He hypothesized that predation mediated priority effects by reducing competition between frog species. Studies on larval insects and frogs in water-filled tree holes and stumps found that abiotic factors such as space, resource availability, and toxin levels can also be important in mediating priority effects.

=== Terrestrial ===
Terrestrial studies on priority effects are rare, with most studies focusing on arthropods or grassland plant species. In a lab experiment, Shorrocks and Bingley (1994) showed that prior arrival increased survivorship for two species of fruit flies; each fly species had inhibitory impacts on the other. A 1996 field study on desert spiders by Ehmann and MacMahon showed that the presence of species from one spider guild reduced establishment of spiders from a different guild. Palmer (2003) demonstrated that priority effects allowed a competitively subordinate ant species to avoid exclusion by a competitively dominant species. If the competitively subordinate ants were able to colonize first, they altered their host tree's morphology in ways that made it less suitable for other ant species. This study was especially important because it was able to identify a mechanism driving observed priority effects.

A study on two species of introduced grasses in Hawaiian woodlands found that the species with inferior competitive abilities may be able to persist through priority effects. At least three studies have come to similar conclusions about the coexistence of native and exotic grasses in California grassland ecosystems. If given time to establish, native species can successfully inhibit the establishment of exotics. The authors of the various studies attributed the prevalence of exotic grasses in California to the low seed production and relatively poor dispersal ability of native species.

== Emerging concepts ==
=== Long-term implications: convergence and divergence ===
Although many studies have documented priority effects, the persistence of these effects over time often remains unclear. Young (2001) indicated that both convergence (in which "communities proceed towards a pre-disturbance state regardless of historical conditions") and divergence (in which historical factors continue to affect the long-term trajectory of community development) are present in nature. Among studies of priority effects, both trends seem to have been observed. Fukami (2005) argued that a community could be both convergent and divergent at different levels of community organization. The authors studied experimentally assembled plant communities and found that while the identities of individual species remained unique across different community replicates, species traits generally became more similar.

=== Trophic ecology ===
Some studies indicate that priority effects can occur across guilds or trophic levels. Such priority effects could have dramatic impacts on community composition and food web structure. Even intra-guild priority effects could have important consequences at multiple trophic levels if the affected species are associated with unique predator or prey species. Consider, for example, a plant species that is eaten by a host-specific herbivore. Priority effects that influence the ability of the plant species to establish would indirectly affect the establishment success of the associated herbivore. Theoretical models have described cyclical assembly dynamics in which species associated with different suites of predators can repeatedly replace one another.

=== Intra-specific aggregation ===
In situations where two species are introduced at the same time, spatial aggregation of a species' propagules could cause priority effects by initially reducing interspecific competition. Aggregation during recruitment and establishment could allow inferior competitors to coexist with or even displace competitive dominants over the long-term. Several modelling efforts have begun to examine the implications of spatial priority effects for species coexistence.

=== Mechanisms and new organisms ===
A few studies have begun to explore the mechanisms driving observed priority effects. Moreover, although past studies focused on a small subset of species, recent papers indicate that priority effects may be important for a wide range of organisms, including fungi, birds, lizards, and salamanders.

=== Ecological restoration ===
Priority effects have important implications for ecological restoration. In many systems, information about priority effects can help practitioners identify cost-effective strategies for improving the survival and persistence of certain species, especially species of inferior competitive ability. For example, in a study on the restoration of native Californian grasses and forbs, Lulow (2004) found that forbs could not establish in plots where bunchgrasses had been previously planted. When bunchgrasses were added to plots where forbs had already been growing for a year, forbs were able to coexist with grasses for at least 3–4 years.
