= Anna Korre =

Environmental engineer

Anna Korre is Professor of Environmental Engineering and heads the Minerals Energy and Environmental Engineering Research Group at Imperial College London. She is also Associate Provost (Sustainability) and has previously been a co-director of the Imperial's Energy Futures Lab. Korre is responsible for the development and embedding of Imperial’s Sustainability Strategy across the University's academic mission. As Professor of Environmental Engineering her work is focused on environmental risk, uncertainty assessment and the life cycle assessment of engineering systems.

== Early life and education ==
Anna Korre grew up in Athens, Greece. Her father was a builder who had moved from Naxos island to Athens and her mother a housewife. She studied geology at the National University of Athens, followed by doctoral studies in environmental engineering at Imperial, investigating the effect of mining of lead, zinc and silver in antiquity and the early twentieth century around the Lavrio region, south of Athens. From 1993 until 1995 Korre had a Marie Curie fellowship in Imperial College London to continue her work on metal pollution in soils and related human health risks. She then returned to Greece for a short time to work in a desk-based role. Korre soon felt the need to return to academia to work on reducing emissions from industrial operations and assessing the environmental impacts and risks to soils, surface waters, humans and ecosystems.

== Career ==
Korre was able to return to Imperial College began to work on a methodology of life-cycle holistic assessment for minerals operations. This methodology was later extended to cover fuels production and the energy industry. Extensive fieldwork around the world and fruitful collaboration with industry partners and researchers at Imperial and abroad have shaped her career. The need for decarbonisation of the power and energy intensive industries has driven her team's research focus on the storage of carbon dioxide deep in the subsurface.

In 2015 Korre was promoted to professor. In recent times, Korre has been a co-director of the Industrial Decarbonisation Research and Innovation Centre and has led and contributed to a large number of international programmes.. The sustainable use of natural resources, integrity, respect and fairness feature significantly in her academic and professional career at Imperial.

== Publications ==
Korre is the author of over 150 scientific publications, conference contributions and reports including:

- Laura Lander, Evangelos Kallitsis, Alastair Hales, Jacqueline Sophie Edge, Anna Korre and Gregory Offer (2021) Cost and carbon footprint reduction of electric vehicle lithium-ion batteries through efficient thermal management. Applied Energy 289 116737.
- Rajesh J. Pawar, Grant S. Bromhal, J. William Carey, William Foxall, Anna Korre, Philip S. Ringrose, Owain Tucker, Maxwell N. Watson and Joshua A. White (2015) Recent advances in risk assessment and risk management of geologic CO2 storage. International Journal of Greenhouse Gas Control 40 pages 292–311.
- Al-Ansari, T., Korre, A., Nie, Z. and Shah, N (2015) Development of a life cycle assessment tool for the assessment of food production systems within the energy, water and food nexus. Sustainable Production and Consumption 2 pages 52–66.
- Korre A., Nie Z. and Durucan S. (2010) Life cycle modelling of fossil fuel power generation with post-combustion CO2 capture. International Journal of Greenhouse Gas Control 4 (2) pages 289–300.
- Sevket Durucan, Anna Korre and Gabriela Munoz-Melendez (2006) Mining life cycle modelling: a cradle-to-gate approach to environmental management in the minerals industry. Journal of Cleaner Production 14 (12–13) pages 1057–1070.
- Imrie CE, Durucan S. and Korre A. (2000) River flow prediction using artificial neural networks: generalisation beyond the calibration range. Journal of Hydrology 233 (1–4) pages 138–153.
