= Julia King, Baroness Brown of Cambridge =

British engineer and life peer (born 1954)

The Right Honourable The Baroness Brown of Cambridge DBE FRS FRAeS FInstP FREng
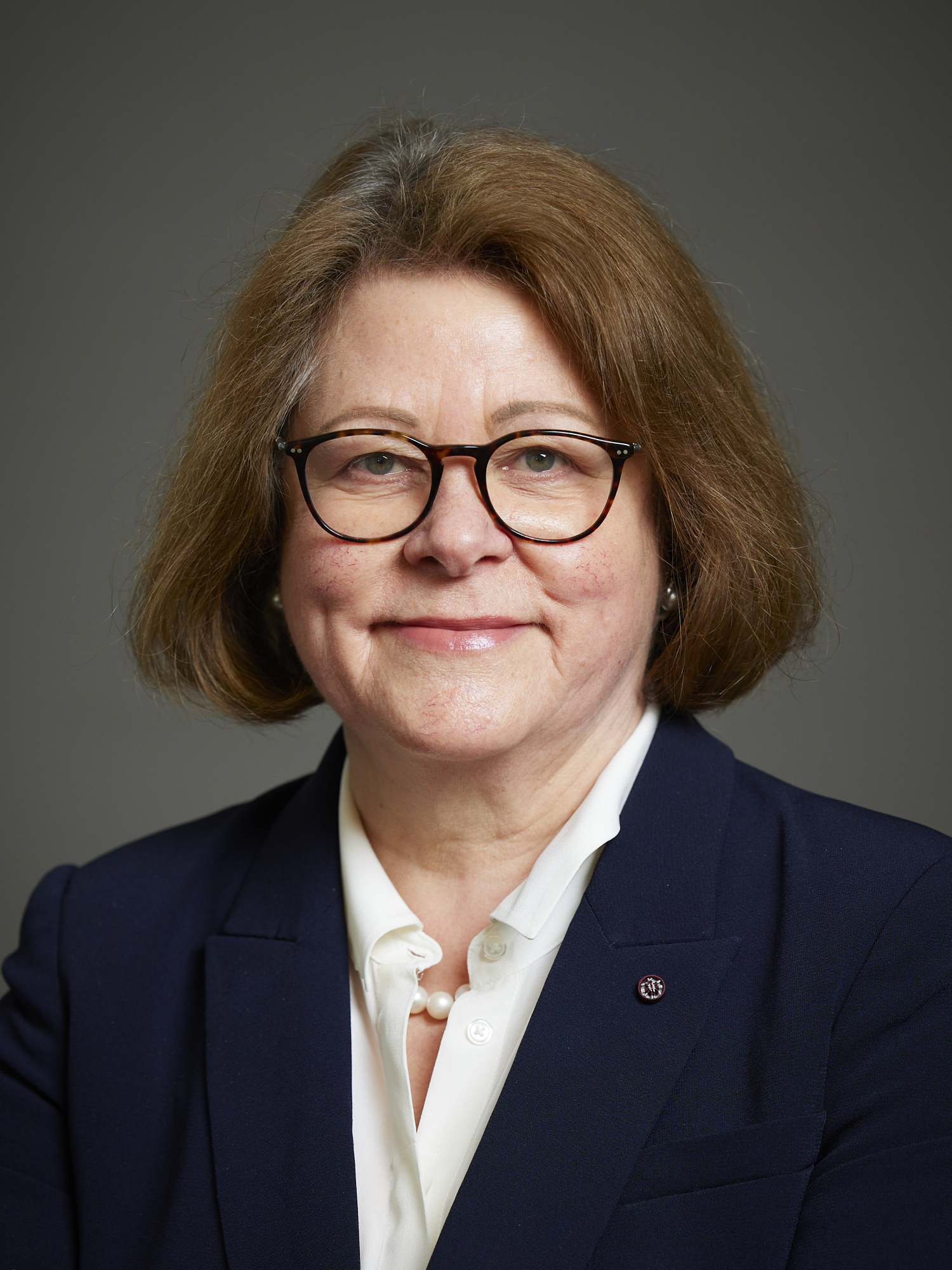
- Official portrait, 2023

Member of the House of Lords
- Lord Temporal
- Life peerage 30 October 2015

Vice-Chancellor of Aston University
- In office 2006–2016
- Preceded by: Michael T. Wright
- Succeeded by: Alec Cameron

Personal details
- Born: Julia Elizabeth King; 11 July 1954 (age 72) Paddington, London, England
- Party: None (crossbencher)
- Spouse: Colin William Brown (m. 1984)
- Scientific career
- Education: Godolphin and Latymer School
- Alma mater: University of Cambridge (BA, PhD)
- Known for: King Review of low-carbon cars
- Workplaces: Aston University; Rolls-Royce plc; Institute of Physics; Imperial College London; Cranfield University
- Thesis: Fracture mechanisms in embrittled alloy steels (1979)
- Doctoral students: James Marrow; David Knowles

Julia Elizabeth King, Baroness Brown of Cambridge (born 11 July 1954) is a British engineer and a crossbench member of the House of Lords, where she previously chaired the Select Committee on Science and Technology. She is the incumbent chair of the Carbon Trust and the Henry Royce Institute, and was the vice-chancellor of Aston University from 2006 to 2016.

== Education ==
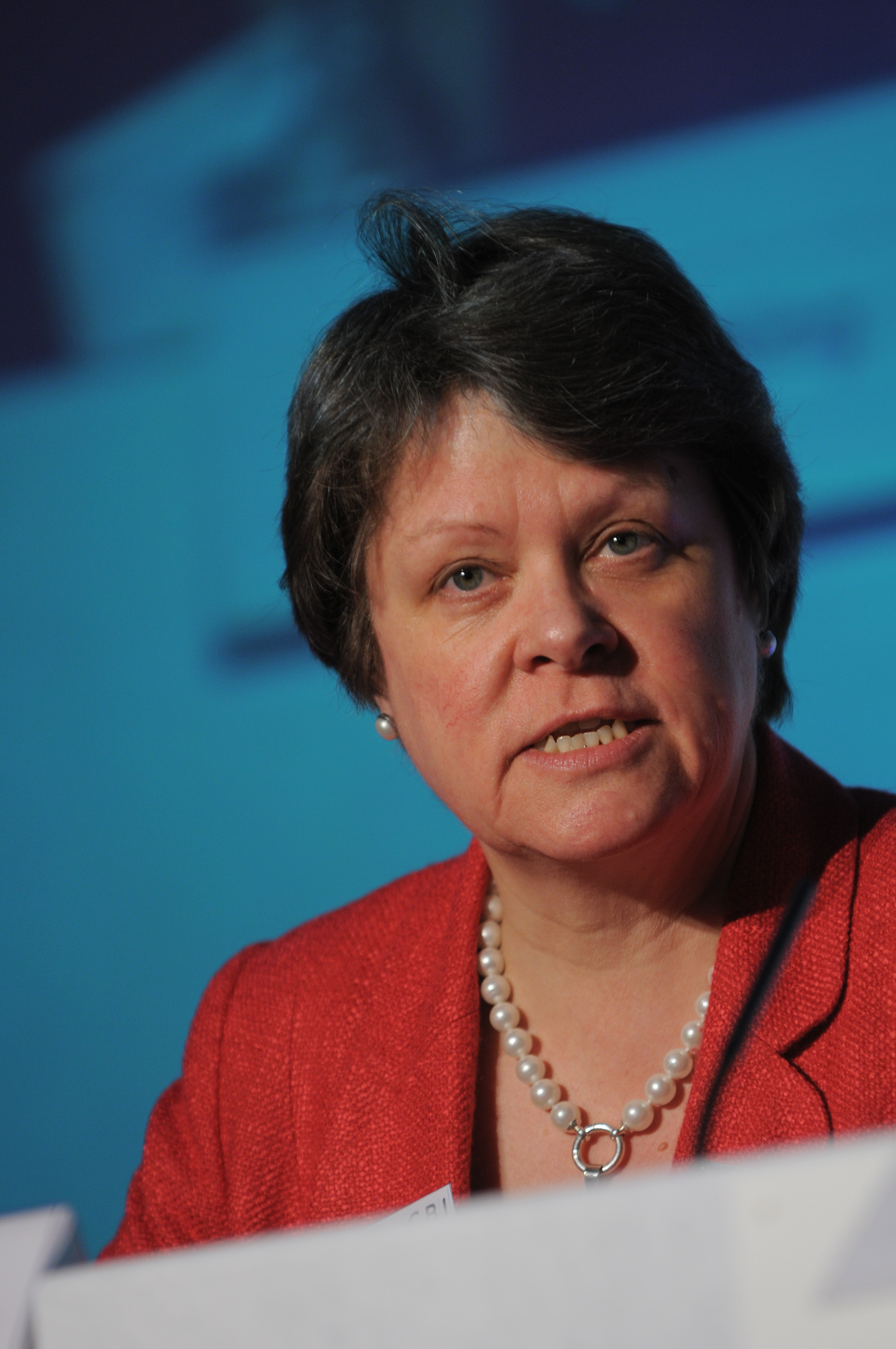
Julia King at the Confederation of British Industry (CBI) Climate Change Summit in 2008

King was born in London on 11 July 1954. She was educated at Godolphin and Latymer Girls' School and New Hall, Cambridge, and graduated from the University of Cambridge with a first degree in Natural Sciences in 1975, followed by a PhD in fracture mechanics in 1978.

== Career ==
King continued at Cambridge as a Rolls-Royce research fellow for 2 years before taking a post as a lecturer at the University of Nottingham from 1980 to 1987. In 1987 she became the first Royal Academy of Engineering senior research fellow. She then returned to Cambridge, holding a series of research and teaching positions from 1987 to 1994. In 1994 she moved to Rolls-Royce, where she held a number of senior positions, including head of materials, managing director of fan systems and engineering director of the marine business. She was appointed chief executive of the Institute of Physics in September 2002. From September 2004 to December 2006 she was principal of the Engineering Faculty at Imperial College London, after which she joined Aston University as vice-chancellor, where she served until September 2016, when she was succeeded by Alec Cameron. King was appointed as chair of STEM Learning Ltd in September 2016.

King has held a number of senior public appointments and works closely with Government on education and technology issues. She is a member of the Committee on Climate Change, the Airports Commission, is the UK's Low Carbon Business Ambassador and was previously a non-executive Director of the Department for Business, Innovation and Skills.

She was an inaugural member of the Governing Board of the European Institute of Innovation and Technology and is a former member of the World Economic Forum Automotive Council. She was a board member of the Engineering and Technology Board (now EngineeringUK) from 2004 to 2008 and led a Royal Academy of Engineering Working Party on "Educating Engineers for the 21st Century" which published its final report in June 2007. King has advised the Ministry of Defence as Chair of the Defence Science Advisory Council and the Cabinet Office as a member of the National Security Forum. She was also a non-executive member of the Technology Strategy Board for five years.

She was a non-executive Director of Angel Trains and is a non-executive director of the Green Investment Bank. She was a member of the Greater Birmingham and Solihull Local Enterprise Partnership, the Engineering and Physical Sciences Research Council, and the Board of Universities UK, chairing its Innovation and Growth Policy Network.

King was appointed by Gordon Brown, the then Chancellor of the Exchequer, in March 2007 to lead the King Review to examine the vehicle and fuel technologies that, over the next 25 years, could help to reduce carbon emissions from road transport. The interim analytical report was published in October 2007, and the final recommendations in March 2008. She has published over 160 papers on fatigue and fracture in structural materials and developments in aerospace and marine propulsion technology, and has been awarded the Grunfeld, John Collier, Lunar Society, Constance Tipper, Bengough and Kelvin medals as well as the Erna Hamburger Prize and the 2012 President's Prize of the Engineering Professors' Council.

=== Honours and awards ===
In 1997 she was elected a Fellow of the Royal Academy of Engineering (FREng) and was appointed Commander of the Order of the British Empire (CBE) for services to materials engineering in the 1999 Birthday Honours. She is a Liveryman of the Goldsmiths Company, an Honorary Graduate of Queen Mary, University of London, the University of Manchester, the University of Exeter and an Honorary Fellow of Murray Edwards College, Cambridge, Cardiff University and of the Institutions of Engineering and Technology, the Society for the Environment and the British Science Association. In 2006 she presented the Higginson Lecture.

On 5 May 2010, she discussed the challenges and opportunities that surround low-carbon transport when she delivered the Institution of Chemical Engineers 6th John Collier memorial lecture. She is the UK government's low carbon business ambassador. She has been named as an Inspiring Woman Engineer by the Royal Academy of Engineering She was promoted to Dame Commander of the Order of the British Empire (DBE) in the 2012 Birthday Honours for services to higher education and technology. In 2023 she was a guest on the BBC Radio 4 programme The Life Scientific.

== Personal life ==
King is married to Colin William Brown, former Chief Executive Officer at the Institution of Mechanical Engineers.

Academic offices
Preceded by Michael T. Wright	Vice-Chancellor of Aston University; 2006–2016	Succeeded by Alec Cameron
