= The Great Egg Race =

BBC television series, 1979 to 1986

- Genre: Game show
- Presented by: Brian Cant (Series 1); Charlotte Allen (Series 1 & 4); Johnny Ball (Series 2); Hilary Henson (Series 2-3); Heinz Wolff (Series 5-8); Lesley Judd (Series 6); Howard Stableford (Series 8)
- Theme music composer: Richard Denton; Martin Cook
- Country of origin: United Kingdom
- Original language: English
- No. of series: 8
- No. of episodes: 68 (list of episodes)

Production
- Producers: Peter Bruce (Series 1-4); Charles Huff (Series 4-8)
- Production location: Pebble Mill Studios
- Running time: 42 minutes (Series 1); 30 minutes
- Production company: BBC Television

Original release
- Network: BBC Two
- Release: 2 January 1979 – 12 September 1986

Related
- The Great Egg Race Rides Again

The Great Egg Race is a BBC television series, in which problem solving teams are given a challenge to design and build machines using limited resources and time, to solve a problem set by the judges.

Sixty-eight episodes were produced and presented by seven presenters over the life of the show which ran for eight series from 1979 to 1986 and was broadcast on BBC 2. The first series consisted of five episodes and series two to eight consisted of nine episodes each.

== Programme ==
The show was presented by Brian Cant (1979), Charlotte Allen (1979 and 1982), Johnny Ball (1980), Hilary Henson (1980–81), Professor Heinz Wolff (1983–1986), Lesley Judd (1984), and Howard Stableford as a guest presenter for one episode in 1986.

Re-edited 15-minute episodes of the original show were later made for BBC Choice in 2000, under the title The Great Egg Race Rides Again.

== Format ==
The series obtained its name from the initial challenge of making a device capable of transporting an egg in a rubber-band-powered vehicle the furthest possible distance without breaking it.

After the initial egg-related challenges, other non-egg events were introduced, and after two series, the original egg-racing was dropped.

The show usually featured three problem solving teams from academia, industry or friend groups, creating Heath Robinson style mechanical creations. The teams had limited resources, having to use ingenuity and creativity in an attempt to solve a complex problem, set at the start of the show.

Each episode featured Heinz Wolff judging, along with a guest judge with expertise in the problem domain; judges included Professor Michael French and Fred Dibnah. Scoring was at the judge's discretion and could be given for categories such as "design", "courage" and "entertainment". Later episodes would see the teams attempt challenges outside of the studio in remote and outdoor locations, and the final series changed the format into a knockout competition.

In the first episode, as well as the egg-carrying challenge between several devices, three teams had to precision weigh three items using a reference weight and ordinary domestic items. In the final episode the two teams' challenge was to take an aerial photograph of an offshore oil rig.

== Title sequence ==
The theme music was by Richard Denton and Martin Cook and is featured on the BBC Records LP Top BBC-TV Themes - Vol 2 (1979).

For series 1 to 3, the cel animation sequence was filmed on a rostrum camera and combined with camera moves.

For series 4 to 7, Aardman Animations created the title sequence of the egg on a rollercoaster made of kitchen utensils. The neon effect programme logo was filmed separately backlit on a rostrum camera and composited with the film shoot in a film optical.

For the Rides Again series, the title sequence was created using the latest digital technology at the time.

Title Screens

Series 1 to 3

Series 4 to 7

Series 8

Rides Again

== Series overview ==
Not all episodes are available publicly and not all episode names are known. Those listed here have been taken from BBC Genome Project and the BFI Archive. Only one episode, The Egg Poachers is known to be lost. A pilot episode was filmed in May 1978.

Series overview
| Series | Presenters | Principal Judge | Episodes | Originally released | |
| Series | Presenters | Principal Judge | Episodes | First released | Last released |
|---|---|---|---|---|---|
| 1 | Brian Cant; Charlotte Allen | Heinz Wolff | 5 | 2 January 1979 | 30 January 1979 |
| 2 | Johnny Ball; Hilary Henson | Heinz Wolff | 9 | 25 March 1980 | 20 May 1980 |
| 3 | Hilary Henson | Heinz Wolff | 9 | 21 March 1981 | 16 June 1981 |
| 4 | Charlotte Allen | Heinz Wolff | 9 | 15 March 1982 | 10 June 1982 |
| 5 | Heinz Wolff | Heinz Wolff | 9 | 30 August 1983 | 25 October 1983 |
| 6 | Heinz Wolff; Lesley Judd | Heinz Wolff | 9 | 29 May 1984 | 24 July 1984 |
| 7 | Heinz Wolff | Heinz Wolff | 9 | 3 May 1985 | 28 June 1985 |
| 8 | Heinz Wolff; Howard Stableford | Heinz Wolff | 9 | 4 July 1986 | 12 September 1986 |

== Episode list ==
=== Series 1 (1979) ===
The opening series features problem-solving teams that have built a machine which can transport a single 70 g (2.5 oz) egg the furthest possible distance, using only a rubber band as a power source. These teams then face an engineering challenge.
The local radio Egg Race Champions compete to find the Champion Eggmobile of Great Britain, winning a £250 prize, the Hartman Fibre Trophy, and to compete in the International Great Egg Race.

| No. overall | No. in series | Title | Guest Judge | Teams | Local Radio Egg Racers | Original release date |
|---|---|---|---|---|---|---|
| 1 | 1 | "Eggmobiles" | Professor Michael French | EMI Leicester Polytechnic The Post Office (Winners) | BBC Radio Birmingham BBC Radio Brighton BBC Radio Manchester | 2 January 1979 |
Problem-solving teams attempt to weigh accurately three objects (a feather, an egg, and a brick) that differ in weight by a ratio of 10000:1, using only a reference weight of 50 g (1.8 oz). Marks are awarded on accuracy and elegance.
| 2 | 2 | "Mechanical Flea" | Professor William Biggs | Nat. West St Marys Hospital Robert Morton (Winners) | BBC Radio London BBC Radio Oxford BBC Radio Plymouth | 9 January 1979 |
The teams have two hours to create a mechanical flea that can jump over a 3 ft (0.9 m) tall square box. There will be three attempts, with minor repairs between jumps allowed. A mechanical launcher is not allowed, so the device must carry all of its energy store and framework with it. Marks are awarded for success of the jumps over the box, and for the design and build of the jumping device.
| 3 | 3 | "Making Music" | Terry Pamplin | British Gas (Winners) Cadbury-Schweppes Loughborough University | BBC Radio Derby BBC Radio Newcastle BBC Radio Norwich | 16 January 1979 |
The teams are to tasked to make music by producing three instruments; one stringed, one wind, and one percussion. The string and wind instruments must produce five notes each, and the percussion five different sounds. Each team must play a piece of music on their instruments. Marks are awarded for the quality and range of the notes produced, and the originality of the solution and the use of the supplied materials. The teams have two and a half hours to produce their designs. Note that in this episode one of the teams utilises Robertson's marmalade jars for their instruments, which at the time featured their Golliwog trade mark, and can be clearly seen. End credits music features the teams presumably playing the show's theme on their instruments.
| 4 | 4 | "Timekeeping" | Professor Ian Fells | Aston University Austin Morris Chloride Technical (Winners) | BBC Radio Bristol BBC Radio Nottingham (Overall Winners) BBC Radio Stoke | 23 January 1979 |
The teams are to create a clock that must run unaided for at least 30 minutes, and sometime during those 30 minutes, they will be asked to measure a period of 120 seconds as accurately as possible. They have 2 and a half hours, using the materials of a kitchen, a tool shed, and a few additions. Score is awarded for the accuracy, endurance, and on the whim of the judges for originality, use of materials and verve of which the problem has been solved.
| 5 | 5 | "Catapult" | Professor Michael French | University College, London Harwell (Winners) CEGB | BBC Radio Leicester; BBC Radio Solent | 30 January 1979 |
Problem-solving teams have just two hours to design and build an 'egg flipping' device. A device which is capable of projecting an egg through a hole, with another device capable of catching it without breaking it. Both devices have size constraints and the egg must not have any protection around it whilst in flight. There are three attempts, with full marks are awarded for a smooth transition between thrower and catcher, with extra marks for the elegance of the design. BBC Radio Nottingham are crowned the Egg Racer series winners. The three furthest travelled teams, along with Charlotte, head to Toronto to challenge the Canadians and Americans. Heinz claims that three world records have been broken during the heats.

=== Series 2 (1980) ===
Once again, teams compete in The Great Egg Race, but this time focusiing on speed, in search of the 'Fastest Eggmobile in the World'. They have a 55 g (1.9 oz) egg, with the fastest machine winning the Hartmann Fibre Trophy, and a prize of £250. First round heats are held locally, such as at Ashton Court and County Hall, Westminster, with second round heats at the London Transport Museum.
Problem-solving teams face engineering challenges.

| No. overall | No. in series | Title | Guest Judge | Teams | Local Radio Egg Racers | Original release date |
|---|---|---|---|---|---|---|
| 6 | 1 | "Weighing Scale" | Professor Michael French | Wellcome Laboratories (Winners) Aberdeen University ICI | BBC Radio Bristol BBC Radio Stoke (Winners) BBC Radio Manchester | 25 March 1980 |
Problem-solving teams have three hours, and must weigh one of the judges, or Johnny Ball. The rules include social co-operation from the judges, so doing anything against their will is not permitted. There is one minute to make the weight measurement, then a further three minutes to do any necessary calculations, with extra marks for direct, immediate weight representation. Calibration must be independently done, without using their own weights. The majority of marks are awarded for accuracy, with the remaining for elegance, audacity, ingenuity, interesting use of materials, and other subjective factors. Calculation of the measurement accuracy is done using a TRS-80 Model I.
| 7 | 2 | "Fluid Automation" | Professor Ian Fells | BP (Winners) Nottingham University Rentokil | BBC Radio Cleveland (Winners) BBC Radio Solent BBC Radio Birmingham | 1 April 1980 |
The teams have three hours to construct a machine that will dispense, as accurately as possible, 150 mL (5.3 imp fl oz) into each of 10 beakers, drawing the fluid from a reservoir which contains 3.5 L (123 imp fl oz). The procedure must take no more than ninety seconds and the machine can not store more than one measurement volume. The machine must be fully automatic, and stop itself after the tenth cup has been filled. Marks are awarded for the mean accuracy and deviation of the volume of the dispensed liquid, speed of operation, and audacity and elegance of the design.
| 8 | 3 | "Beans and Stresses" | Dr Anthony Flint | Allied Breweries Pilkington Brothers (Winners) Liverpool University | BBC Radio London BBC Radio Scotland BBC Radio Derby (Winners) | 8 April 1980 |
The problem is to build a bridge that spans a bottomless chasm between two rocky ledges. In two and a half hours, the teams are to construct a contrivance that will allow them to retrieve a 10 lb (4.5 kg) bowl of dried beans from across the chasm, standing on the ledge on the other side. They have three minutes to retrieve the bowl and as many beans as they can. Marks are awarded for retrieving the bowl, retrieving the beans, speed of retrieval, and elegancy, audacity and any other appealing features of the machine's design. Any items that fall into the chasm will be lost and not counted towards the retrieved items.
| 9 | 4 | "Pea Picking" | Dr Bob Adams | Bird's Eye Foods Ministry of Defence (Winners) U.M.I.S.T. | BBC Radio Solent (Winners) BBC Radio Wales BBC Radio London | 15 April 1980 |
1000 dried peas are scattered in an 8 ft (2.4 m) circle on the floor. The teams have been given a total of three hours to construct a self-powered machine that will gather as many of the peas as possible in three minutes. If the machine stays outside of the circle, they're allowed to maintain it. If it stops inside the circle, the machine can be rescued and started again. Only peas stored in the machine at the end of the run will be counted. Marks are awarded for collecting 25% of the peas, pro-rata for lesser quantities. If sufficient peas are collected below the allocated time, teams can score points for the remaining time. Finally there are marks for elegance, audacity, and general likeability of their solutions.
| 10 | 5 | "Sink or Swim" | Des Sleightholme | KTM-Vickers (Winners) Lloyds Bank Forensic Science Laboratory | BBC Radio Nottingham (Winners) BBC Radio Birmingham BBC Radio Manchester | 22 April 1980 |
The teams must make a boat that can float and carry a member of the team. Marks are awarded for a team member getting in, paddling three lengths of the pool within two minutes, and getting out again. There are also marks for design, construction, and manoeuvrability of the craft, with more points for the highest ratio of cargo weight to the weight of the boat.
| 11 | 6 | "Music Machine" | Terry Pamplin | Dowty London Hospital (Winners) Tate and Lyle | BBC Radio Leicester BBC Radio London (Winners) BBC Radio Derby | 29 April 1980 |
The teams have three hours to make an automatic musical instrument which must be capable of playing a recognisable popular tune for a period of at least 10 seconds. The machine can be manual or motor driven. The judges are looking for musical quality, the mechanical ingenuity of driving the instrument, and its entertainment value.
| 12 | 7 | "Kitchen Acrobatics" | Professor Ian Fells | British Steel (Winners) Chailey Heritage Hospital Plessey | BBC Radio Stoke BBC Radio Cleveland (Winners) BBC Radio Derby | 6 May 1980 |
The first egg-racing semi-final. The teams have three hours to make a machine that will automatically toss a pancake, either by emulating a human or inventing an entirely new way. Marks are awarded for two successful tosses, and elegance of the design.
| 13 | 8 | "Sorting Out" | Professor Gordon Higginson | BNFL (Winners) IMI ITDG | BBC Radio Solent BBC Radio Nottingham BBC Radio London (Winners) | 13 May 1980 |
The second egg-racing semi-final. The teams are given 0.5 imp gal (2.3 L) of a dried mixed of beans, peas, lentils, and polystyrene packing material in a bucket. In three hours they are to build a machine that will sort the mix into its four constituent components within a two minute time limit. The machine can be automated or manually powered, however the sorting intelligence must reside in the machine and not the operator. Marks are awarded for separation and purity of the constituents, and for elegance of the machine's design.
| 14 | 9 | "A Meal on Wheels" | Professor Bruce Archer | British Aerospace (Winners) Oxford University Racal Electronics Group | BBC Radio Cleveland BBC Radio London BBC Radio Derby (Winners) | 20 May 1980 |
The egg-racing final. The teams are tasked with making a self-propelled meal using only items given to them on a table. They have to launch the meal from one end of a 12 ft (3.7 m) long banqueting table to the judges, who are at the other end. Marks are given for mobility, dietetic balance, gourmet quality, and general impertinence of the solution. There are two and a half hours given to build the machines.

=== Series 3 (1981) ===
From this series, The Great Egg Race has been dropped, continuing with only the problem solving teams.

| No. overall | No. in series | Title | Guest Judge | Teams | Original release date |
|---|---|---|---|---|---|
| 15 | 1 | "Making an Impression" | Michael Peters | Eastman Dental Hospital Southern Electricity (Winners) HSTA | 21 April 1981 |
Teams are challenged to design and construct and demonstrate their answer to Caxton. They are required to make a machine that in two minutes will print ten posters which will advertise The Great Egg Race. The posters will have to be printed in at least two colours and the part of the mechanism that actually applies the printing to the paper must be indirectly driven. They are permitted to feed the paper manually. Marks are awarded for completing ten prints in two minutes, quality of the print, and engineering ingenuity. Extra marks can be gained for using additional colours and general judge appeal.
| 16 | 2 | TBA | Professor Gordon Higginson | The National Institute of Agricultural Engineering GKN Rolls-Royce and Associates | 28 April 1981 |
Teams are given three hours to design and construct a man-powered, man-carrying vehicle, using only the contents of a kitchen.
| 17 | 3 | "Gramophone" | Terry Pamplin | Atkins R&D Brush Electrical Machines (Winners) South West Wales School of Radiography | 5 May 1981 |
Problem-solving teams have three hours to construct a mechanical record player to make music from old 78 records. Provided with an electrical turntable, the teams need to create a pickup and sound-emitting device. Marks are for playing recognisable music for at least 20 seconds, loudness of the audio, quality of reproduction, and for the design and construction of the player. For extra points they can construct the turntable and speed controller.
| 18 | 4 | TBA | Professor Michael French | Kenwood Engineering Marconi Radar Systems Warwick Research Unit for the Blind | 12 May 1981 |
Teams are challenged to construct a variety of measuring devices, given only a 6 mm (0.24 in) ball bearing for reference.
| 19 | 5 | TBA | Professor Ian Fells | Royal Navy N. E. I. Parsons Shirley Institute | 19 May 1981 |
Teams must put their best foot forward to stay above water.
| 20 | 6 | "A Portrait for Posterity" | Professor Ian Fells | Glasgow Royal Infirmary Britannia Airways Shand Civil Engineering | 26 May 1981 |
Teams, in only three-and-a-half hours, with no camera, no film and no darkroom, must produce a photograph of all three team members.
| 21 | 7 | "Hooplistics" | Professor Gordon Higginson | Kontron Electrolab (Winners) Life Science Research ICL | 2 June 1981 |
Teams are to design, build and operate an mechanical hoop projector that will project 18 hoops in 90 seconds at a range of 4 m (13 ft) to a target of pegs. The thrown hoop will only win marks if it lands over the peg of its own colour, and the team with the most marks will win. There are three target pegs differing in colour, height, and distance.
| 22 | 8 | TBA | Dr John Iredale | Alfred Bader Ltd Cranfield Product Engineering Centre Ministry of Defence | 9 June 1981 |
Teams are given three-and-a-half hours to unravel and weigh an item.
| 23 | 9 | TBA | Jock Smith | National Nuclear Corporation Plessey Telecoms Handicapped Persons' Research Unit | 16 June 1981 |
Teams have three-and-a-half hours to design and build 'A Great Egg' eggmobile.

=== Series 4 (1982) ===
| No. overall | No. in series | Title | Guest Judge | Teams | Original release date |
|---|---|---|---|---|---|
| 24 | 1 | "The Egg Poachers" | Professor Ian Fells | Wilkinson Sword BXL Plastics London immunologists | 15 April 1982 |
Problem-solving teams are challenged to design, construct and demonstrate a moving problem with a cracking result. This is the only known episode to be lost from the archive.
| 25 | 2 | "Shuttlecocks and Badminton Rackets" | Professor Michael French | RNEC Central School (Winners) British Engineerium | 22 April 1982 |
Teams are challenged on how to construct an automatic badminton server. They must make a machine that when put on a full-sized badminton court will automatically serve shuttlecocks in such a way that will land in the legal area on the other side of the net. The machine will be started by a single triggering action from an operator, and teams will be allowed to re-cock the machine between serves. They have six shuttlecocks and can recover them to reload. Marks are awarded for the total number of legal serves achieved in two minutes, with additional marks at the caprice of the judges.
| 26 | 3 | "Music Without Tears" | Terry Pamplin | University of Oxford (Winners) St George's Hospital The Institute of Occupational Medicine | 29 April 1982 |
Teams are challenged to do for music what the pocket calculator has done for mathematics. They are to construct a portable machine that must play one, or two recorders, for at least 30 seconds and have at least four different notes, achieved entirely mechanically. Points are awarded on being able to play a recognisable tune for the time required, and on the quality of the musical rendition.
| 27 | 4 | "A Rather Unusual Target" | Claude Blair | Yarsley Technical Centre British Telecom DATAC | 6 May 1982 |
Teams are given three hours to set their sights on a rather unusual target.
| 28 | 5 | "Bridge That Gap" | Professor Gordon Higginson | Princess Margaret Rose Orthopaedic Hospital GEC Jaymic | 13 May 1982 |
Teams have a narrow ledge, a chasm with a raging torrent below, and no bridge - how to get across?
| 29 | 6 | "In One Minute from Now" | John Stevenson | SIRA Institute Wuidart Engineering Oxford Medical Systems | 20 May 1982 |
Teams are given the problem of designing and building a one-minute ticking clock.
| 30 | 7 | "The Big Deal" | Professor Ian Fells | Opsec Townsend Thoresen Photographers (Winners) | 27 May 1982 |
Given three and a half hours, the task the teams must face is to construct a machine into which a pack of playing cards can be inserted, and which will then automatically deal four hands of thirteen cards in the space of two minutes. The teams cannot touch the cards once they have been inserted into the machine, however they can manually power the devices. Marks are awarded for the accuracy of the dealt cards and the elegancy of the design.
| 31 | 8 | "The Ovipositor" | Professor Gordon Higginson | East Midlands Electricity Metropolitan Police Forensic Science Laboratory Newcastle University | 3 June 1982 |
Teams are set the problem of inventing a 'handy' kitchen gadget.
| 32 | 9 | "The Egg Walker" | Jock Smith | Metal Box Military Vehicles and Engineering Establishment Paul Hepworth Associates | 10 June 1982 |
Teams are set the problem of designing, building and racing an Egg Walker.

=== Series 5 (1983) ===
| No. overall | No. in series | Title | Guest Judge | Teams | Original release date |
|---|---|---|---|---|---|
| 33 | 1 | "The Ghost at the Machine" | Dr Andy Irwin | TBA | 30 August 1983 |
Teams have to operate a typewriter is in a locked room so all the operation has to be done through the keyhole.
| 34 | 2 | "When the Petrol Runs Out" | Jock Smith | Kidbrooke School Johnson Matthey (Winners) Hendre Quarry | 6 September 1983 |
From the NEC, Birmingham. Teams have to dismantle Citroën 2CVs, before rebuilding them to make vehicles light enough to lift over a 50 cm (20 in) wall, strong enough to carry three people, and fast enough to beat the others over a straight course of 50 m (164 ft). All this without using any petrol. Power must be self-contained in the vehicle and it must have working brakes. Marks are awarded for the time taken to complete the 50 m run itself in addition to marks for elegance and engineering excellence.
| 35 | 3 | "Caged" | Victor Liardet | TBA | 13 September 1983 |
Teams have to design and build a combination lock that will defy their opponents lock picking abilities.
| 36 | 4 | "Staying Aloft" | Wing Commander Ken Wallis | MOD Shoeburyness Hawtal Whiting (Winners) British Caledonian | 20 September 1983 |
Teams attempt to make craft that, even if they cannot carry animals, can at least fly - a bit. Teams have four hours to construct a device that will lift itself into the air under its own power, starting from ground level. Marks are awarded for the flight time achieved, the weight lifted into the air, and further points are at the judges' discretion. There is a cut-off limit for aircraft with a very short flight time.
| 37 | 5 | "Out of Your Depth" | Professor Stephen Salter | Mildenhall Upper School (Winners) Wirral Borough Council Seven Seas | 27 September 1983 |
This challenge is on the rather damper side. Teams are faced with a tank of water is 10 ft (3.0 m) long with a floating island in the middle. They have to build a submarine that will start on the surface on one side, dive, pass underneath the island, and surface on the other side. The submarine can not have any attachments of wire or tubes. Marks are awarded for passing the obstruction, how deep the vehicle dives, engineering design and use of the materials, and the rest are at the judges' discretion.
| 38 | 6 | "A Shocking Problem" | Terry Wilkinson | TBA | 4 October 1983 |
Teams have to light the light at Battersea Power Station and make one of the giant meters register.
| 39 | 7 | "The Flickering Light" | Professor Ian Fells | Cam Gears Queen's University Belfast British Steel (Winners) | 11 October 1983 |
Teams have the task to build a 35 mm cinema projector, which is capable of showing a 30 second film clip onto a 4 ft (1.2 m) screen. The teams are given basic projection equipment and must focus on the film transport mechanism which can be either manual or automated. Marks are awarded for getting the picture in focus, lack of flicker, duration of run, and engineering design and ingenuity.
| 40 | 8 | "The Egg and Spoon Race" | Professor Gordon Higginson | TBA | 18 October 1983 |
Teams must construct a vehicle that will race down a bumpy track carrying an egg in the bowl of a dessert spoon.
| 41 | 9 | "The Rangefinder" | Professor Ian Fells | TBA | 25 October 1983 |
Teams must measure the height of Battersea Power Station's chimneys.

=== Series 6 (1984) ===
This series features a short side challenge, hosted by Lesley Judd, called The Incredible Egg Machine, in which teams have to transport a large egg from a nest in a tree to a giant eggcup on a table. This should be accomplished in the most complicated and entertaining way possible, with teams passing the egg from one team to another to achieve the objective.

| No. overall | No. in series | Title | Guest Judge | Teams | The Incredible Egg Machine | Original release date |
|---|---|---|---|---|---|---|
| 42 | 1 | "Thereby Hangs a Tail" | Professor Ian Fells | Huddersfield Polytechnic Computer Dept. Computer Technology Ltd Wrexham and District Computer Club (Winners) | Introduction | 29 May 1984 |
The problem for the teams is to create a tail. It must be realistically attached to one member of the team, and should be able to express joy, dejection, and excitement. Marks are awarded for expression of the emotions, engineering design, and appearance, elegance, and charisma. Bonus marks it the tail is prehensile and can be used to grasp a banana.
| 43 | 2 | "The Aquabikes" | Peter Schiller | TBA | Reading Borough Council | 5 June 1984 |
In Germany, the teams must cycle on water.
| 44 | 3 | "Cause for Alarm" | Brigadier Alan Needham | British Telecom (Scotland) STC Quartz Grassland Research Institute (Winners) | Delco Products | 12 June 1984 |
Teams must engineer a system of burglar alarms to protect a secret document that is hidden in an office. Marks are awarded for engineer capability, ingenuity, how the detection devices are deployed and the timing of deployment, and the most skilful burglar.
| 45 | 4 | "Putting on the Pressure" | Fred Dibnah | National Maritime Institute W. S. Atkins Scorraig Crofters (Winners) | Ministry of Defence - "Pea Picking" Winners | 19 June 1984 |
At the Greater Manchester Museum of Science and Industry, teams must construct a stationary 'steam engine' that runs on compressed air, that can lift a 14 lb (6.4 kg) weight to a height of 4 ft (1.2 m). Materials to build a heavy flywheel will not be available, so the teams must rely on valves. Due to the difficulty of the challenge, teams are given more than the usual time, having 6 hours total. Marks are awarded for the design, capability of the machine to lift the weight up off of the floor, courage of design, and entertainment value.
| 46 | 5 | "Desert Island Bikes" | Professor Gordon Higginson | Practical Partners Bicester Farming Club (Winners) Morganite Crucible | The Yardley Team | 26 June 1984 |
There is a desert island in the studio with bits of bicycles on it. The teams have four hours to construct machinery that must operate from areas equidistant around the island. They must rescue as many parts of the bicycle as possible and the winning team will be the first to construct a bike and cycle it around the studio. To ensure the machine operates delicately, an egg will also have to be rescued, unbroken. If the teams accidentally pick up an opposing team's part, they must return it to the same place. Points are awarded for recovery of an undamaged egg, first bicycle completed, first team to pedal a bicycle on a complete circuit of the set, completeness of bicycle assembly, and design, construction and operation of the retrieval device.
| 47 | 6 | "A Remote Problem" | Jock Smith | TBA | TBA | 3 July 1984 |
In Manchester, using a miniature TV camera, teams must build a vehicle that will search through a warehouse to retrieve a glowing ball.
| 48 | 7 | "Time for Tea" | Professor Ian Fells | Dunlop (Winners) AMTE Napton Village | Hawtal Whiting - "Staying Aloft" Winners | 10 July 1984 |
Teams turn confusion into infusion by making machines to brew the perfect cup of tea. The descent of a heavy ball bearing must trigger the stages of the tea-making process, including dunking a teabag, and adding milk and sugar. Marks are awarded for engineering, style and elegance, taste and bouquet of the tea.
| 49 | 8 | "Reaching the Heights" | Peter Schiller | TBA | TBA | 17 July 1984 |
In Germany, teams will race over an obstacle course with the parts of a very tall structure, then hoist a flag.
| 50 | 9 | "The Windpumps" | Fabian Acker | TBA | TBA | 24 July 1984 |
Teams must build large windpumps to pump water.

=== Series 7 (1985) ===
| No. overall | No. in series | Title | Guest Judge | Teams | Original release date |
|---|---|---|---|---|---|
| 51 | 1 | "Igloos" | Myrtle Simpson | Army Ammo School Southwark Surveyors Plumpton Village (Winners) | 3 May 1985 |
In Aviemore, teams have to make themselves at home by building an igloo with basic arctic survival equipment, big enough to fit the team and judges in. Marks are awarded for habitability, architecture, construction and decoration. End credits music is a rendition of Vic Mizzy & Irving Taylor's song Igloo.
| 52 | 2 | TBA | Harry Arnold | Lea Manor School Glaxochem Kent Fire Brigade (Winners) | 10 May 1985 |
Teams have to prepare a craft from a Reliant Robin to sail on a canal. Marks are awarded for placement in the race, engineering design, and decoration of the vessel.
| 53 | 3 | "Huskies" | Hamish MacInnes | RAF St Athan Benfords Appliance Testing Laboratory (Winners) | 17 May 1985 |
Once again in Aviemore, teams have to build electro-mechanical huskies to pull members of the team on a sled on an indoor course. Marks are awarded for engineering design, manoeuvrability, time to navigate a course, and other pleasing dog-like touches.
| 54 | 4 | "The Robot Piano Player" | Peter Skellern | Stag Furniture Fylde Guitars (Winners) Early Music Shop | 24 May 1985 |
Teams have to build a robot piano player. They must construct a piece of machinery that can be wheeled up to a grand piano and play a piece of music recognisable by the judges and audience. The machine can be either self or hand powered. Marks are awarded for recognition of the piece being played, quality of the musical rendition and length of the tune, engineering design of the machine, and the rest of the points are awarded at the caprice of the judges. End credits music is Bach's Jesu, Joy of Man's Desiring.
| 55 | 5 | "Fire" | Professor Ian Fells | TBA | 31 May 1985 |
Teams have to construct a machine that will make fire.
| 56 | 6 | "Hovercraft" | Ray Wheeler | HMS Sultan JK Lasers (Winners) Snowden Hill Men | 7 June 1985 |
At HMS Daedalus, teams have to construct a radio-controlled mini-hovercraft using the contents of a garden shed and pilot it around a course. Marks are awarded for hovercraft performance, engineering design, and entertainment.
| 57 | 7 | "Photography" | Brian Coe | Analog Devices Ruddocks Printers LBMS Consultants (Winners) | 14 June 1985 |
Teams are tasked with taking a photograph without the aid of a camera or dark room, reminiscent of a photo booth. They must take a photograph of the studio audience and produce a positive print as quickly as possible. Marks are awarded for speed of producing the photograph, the quality of it, artistic merit, and engineering design.
| 58 | 8 | "Mobo Horse" | John Watson | TBA | 21 June 1985 |
Again at HMS Daedalus, teams have to make a cross between a horse, bike, and a car - a mobohorse.
| 59 | 9 | "Dastardly Deeds at Eggraze Hall" | Mat Irvine | Berkshire Brewery Co. Moving Display Willpower (Winners) | 28 June 1985 |
Teams have to create a play in three acts, starring John Leeson and Hal Dyer. Theatre experts will provide lighting, set, actors, sound, and even the scope. This week the teams will provide the special effects for the play. Marks are awarded for technical ingenuity used in arranging their special effects, and the entertainment and amusement value of the effects.

=== Series 8 (1986) ===
This series features a knock-out competition.

| No. overall | No. in series | Title | Guest Judge | Teams | Original release date |
|---|---|---|---|---|---|
| 60 | 1 | "The Biggest Paper Aeroplane in the World" | Dizzy Addicott | Fosters (Winners) TBA TBA | 4 July 1986 |
First heat Teams attempt to get the Guinness World Record, to make the largest paper glider in the world. Materials are limited to brown paper, newspaper and string, with the winning machine flying the furthest.
| 61 | 2 | "The Treasure Map" | Michael Brand | Gloucester Postal Engineers (Winners) Northern Lights Stranmillis College | 11 July 1986 |
Second heat The teams are tasked with mapping the adjacent bay east of the Giant's Causeway, from four fixed points, some of which may not be accessible, using only basic materials and a school geometry set. At the end, the teams are given co-ordinates to where hidden treasure from the nearby shipwrecked ship Girona is buried and they must use their maps to find it. Marks are awarded for the quality of the map and the instrumentation used to produce it, for closeness of finding the treasure, and the prettiness of the map.
| 62 | 3 | "The Fork Lift" | Dr Peter Kitchin | J J Barker (Winners) TBA TBA | 25 July 1986 |
Third heat At the Scottish Exhibition Centre the teams must build a forklift truck and move 500 eggs as fast as possible with it.
| 63 | 4 | "The Long Tide" | Professor Ian Fells | Emergency Exit Arts (Winners) TBA TBA | 1 August 1986 |
Fourth heat On Brancaster Sands the teams have only a few hours to build a wave-powered machine to hoist a flag.
| 64 | 5 | "The Still" | Willie MacKay | Cancer and Polio Research Fund (Winners) TBA TBA | 8 August 1986 |
Fifth heat In Northern Ireland the teams have to make stills to desalinate fresh water from the sea using an old fridge.
| 65 | 6 | "The Crane" | Jim O'Niel | On Site (Winners) TBA TBA | 15 August 1986 |
Sixth heat At the Scottish Exhibition Centre, at the site of the Clyde docks, the teams have to make dockside cranes, which are tested to destruction.
| 66 | 7 | "The Greasy Pole" | Professor Meredith Thring | Emergency Exit Arts (Winners) Cancer and Polio Research Fund; Fosters The Judges (Heinz Wolff, Ian Fells, Michael French) | 22 August 1986 |
First semi-final On Brancaster Sands, Howard Stableford takes over the presenting duty, surprising the presenters. A guest team made up of the judges take on teams who must make a machine that can destroy a rival while both are balancing on a horizontal pole. The devices must be mechanical, must sit 18 in (46 cm) above the pole, not more than 4.5 in (11.4 cm) below it, and weigh not more than 10 lb (4.5 kg). Scoring is a simple knockout competition between the teams. Should there be a draw, the judges will decide which device they think it the most ingenious, and that be declared the winner.
| 67 | 8 | "Back to Nature" | Cynthia McArthur | Gloucester Postal Engineers On Site (Winners) J J Barker | 5 September 1986 |
Second semi-final At the Scottish Exhibition Centre, teams must make a breakfast of a buttered bread roll, and coffee with milk and sugar. They only have the ingredients of raw wheat, green coffee beans, sugar beet, and a cow or goat for the milk. Marks are awarded for quality for the food, quantity produced, and for the engineering design of the equipment used to manufacture the meal.
| 68 | 9 | "The Oil Platform" | Tom Pratt | On Site; Emergency Exit Arts (Winners) | 12 September 1986 |
Final Briefed at Duthie Park, the finalists must take an aerial photograph of the BP Forties Delta platform, out in the North Sea, off the coast of Aberdeen. The winners get the 1986 Great Egg Race golden trophy. Marks are awarded for the quality of the picture taken, and the engineering ingenuity that has gone into creating it.
