= King Review =

The King Review of low-carbon cars was launched in 2007 by the British Government to examine the vehicle and fuel technologies which could help to decarbonise road transport over the next 25 years.

The Review was led by Professor Julia King CBE FREng, Vice-Chancellor of Aston University and former Director of Advanced Engineering at Rolls-Royce plc.

The interim analytical report was published in October 2007, and focused on the potential for the reduction of CO_{2} emissions from road transport. It concluded:

- Urgent progress is needed from road transport to help meet emission cuts for the developed world of 60-80 per cent by 2050 outlined in the Stern Review.
- At low cost and by 2030, per-kilometre emissions from road transport could be reduced by 50 per cent.
- Electric or hydrogen-powered vehicles have the potential to make near complete decarbonisation of road transport a realistic long-term objective.
- Biofuels have a role in the future UK fuel market, though demand must not be allowed to grow too quickly without robust environmental safeguards in place.

The final stage of the Review was published in March 2008, and gave recommendations on how the Government can play a role in decarbonising transport.
