= Ian Fells =

British energy conversion expert (1932–2025)

Ian Fells, CBE, FREng, FRSE (5 September 1932 – 20 August 2025) was a British energy conversion expert and academic. He was Professor of Energy Conversion at the University of Newcastle upon Tyne, and chairman of the "New and Renewable Energy Centre" at Blyth, Northumberland, England.

== Life and career ==
Fells was born in Sheffield, England on 5 September 1932. He was educated at King Edward VII School, Broomhill, Sheffield, then carried out national service in the British army, before studying at Trinity College, Cambridge where he gained an M.A. then in 1958 a PhD entitled "The kinetics of the hydrolysis of the chlorinated methanes". After lecturing in Chemical Engineering and Fuel Technology at the University of Sheffield he was appointed Reader in Fuel Science at King's College of University of Durham in 1962. In 1963, this college became the University of Newcastle upon Tyne, and he was on the staff of the Chemical Engineering Department. He was Professor of Energy Conversion at Newcastle University from 1975 and published some 200 papers on a varied range of topics, including:

- The chemical physics of combustion
- fuel cells
- rocket combustion
- energy economics
- environmental protection
- energy conversion systems
- energy policy

Fells was a long-standing advocate of nuclear power. As of 2008, Fells was of the view that "any notion that renewables can provide for all our [energy] requirements is a mischievous and reckless boast".

Fells made over 500 television and radio programmes, including the popular TV science series Take Nobody's Word For It with Carol Vorderman, and regularly appeared as a guest expert and judge on The Great Egg Race from 1979 to 1986.

He was a science adviser to the World Energy Council and a special adviser to select committees of both the House of Lords and the House of Commons as well as serving on several Cabinet and Research Council committees. He was chairman of the UK-based National Renewable Energy Centre (Narec), was an energy adviser to the European Union and European Parliament, advised a number of Foreign Governments on energy policy; and was a consultant to various multinational companies.

In 2012, he joined Newcastle-based company Penultimate Power UK as the Technical Director to develop small modular reactors.

His first wife, Hazel, a mathematician, passed away in 2017. They had four sons, all engineers. In 2018 he married Candida Whitmill, the Managing Director of Penultimate Power UK.

Fells died after a long illness on 20 August 2025, at the age of 92.

== Honours ==
In 1976, Fells was awarded the Beilby Medal and Prize. He was then elected Fellow of The Royal Academy of Engineering in 1979 and was President of the Institute of Energy (now the Energy Institute) for 1978-79. In 1993 he received the Michael Faraday medal and prize from the Royal Society, and was elected Fellow of The Royal Society of Edinburgh in 1996. He was awarded the Melchett Medal of the Energy Institute in 1999 and the John Collier Medal of the Institution of Chemical Engineers in the same year. He was awarded a CBE in June 2000. In the same year, he presented the Higginson Lecture at Durham University.
