= David Knowles (engineer) =

Researcher

Professor David Knowles CBE FREng FIMMM
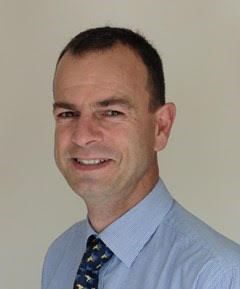
- Born: 6 January 1967 (age 59); Bridport
- Citizenship: British; New Zealand
- Education: St. Catharine's College, Cambridge
- Occupation: CEO Henry Royce Institute
- Scientific career
- Fields: Structural Integrity; Materials Engineering
- Workplaces: University of Cambridge; University of Bristol; Henry Royce Institute
- Doctoral advisor: Julia King

David Michael Knowles CBE FREng FIMMM is Professor of Nuclear Engineering at the University of Bristol and Chief Executive Officer of the UK's Henry Royce Institute for advanced materials research. From 2016 to 2019, he was the co-director of the South West Nuclear Hub, and Atkins Fellow. His research and consultancy work focusses primarily on understanding and modelling the degradation mechanisms in metallic materials and their interrelation with the structural integrity of rotating and static equipment in the energy sector.

== Education ==
Knowles was educated at Toller Porcorum primary school, Beaminster School and St Catharine's College, Cambridge, graduating from the university in 1988, with triple first class honours in natural sciences (taking Materials Science and Metallurgy in Part II). He then went on to complete a PhD in 1991 - on the topic of the fatigue and fracture behaviour of aluminium-lithium based composites - under the supervision of Dr Julia King (now Baroness Brown of Cambridge).

== Career ==
Knowles began his career in 1991 with a research fellowship at St Catharine's College, Cambridge, before moving to New Zealand to work as a research and consultancy metallurgist for Industrial Research Ltd between 1993 and 1995. He then returned to the University of Cambridge in 1995 to take up a post as lecturer in Mechanical Properties of Materials, and was also appointed assistant director of Research of the Rolls-Royce University Technology Centre. His research at that time focussed on fatigue and creep in nickel based superalloys including high stress 'low' temperature creep anisotropy in single crystals. In 2001 Knowles returned to New Zealand to take up the role of CTO at MPT Solutions, where he continued to publish academic papers with a developing interest in crystal plasticity. In 2006 he was appointed Global Research Leader for Materials at Shell Global Solutions, based in Amsterdam looking into materials for LNG and gas to liquid technologies. In 2010, he moved to Atkins as their materials authority in the energy sector, focussing on offshore wind turbine foundations and nuclear Advanced Gas Reactors. In 2016 he took up a post at the University of Bristol as Professor of Nuclear Engineering, and co-director of the South West Nuclear Hub.

Knowles was named Chief Executive of the Henry Royce Institute for advanced materials research in 2019. He has continued his research as the principal investigator on the 'Sindri' prosperity partnership EPSRC project, working with a number of university partners alongside EDF and UKAEA, which is focussed on characterising and modelling the meso to macro scale mechanics of alloys. In particular, he is interested in researching the use of data-centric methods to interrogate and describe material mechanical behaviour which can then be used to predict the condition of components of nuclear power plants.

In 2024 Knowles instigated and oversaw the development of a National Materials Innovation Strategy, establishing a Materials Leadership Group under the Chair of Allan Cook to support wide engagement across the industrial and academic research community in the UK. Over 2000 researchers were consulted from over 270 companies and the strategy was published in January 2025 with wide media coverage

== Awards and recognition ==
Knowles was awarded a Fellowship of the Institute of Materials, Minerals and Mining (FIMMM) in 2004 in recognition of his contributions to the field of materials science. In 2015, he was also made Fellow of the Royal Academy of Engineering (FREng). He holds two European patents and has authored over 100 academic papers - ten of which have been cited over 100 times - and gives numerous invited lectures and conference keynotes each year
