= Heinz Wolff =

German-British scientist and television presenter (1928–2017)

Heinz Wolff FIEE, FRSA
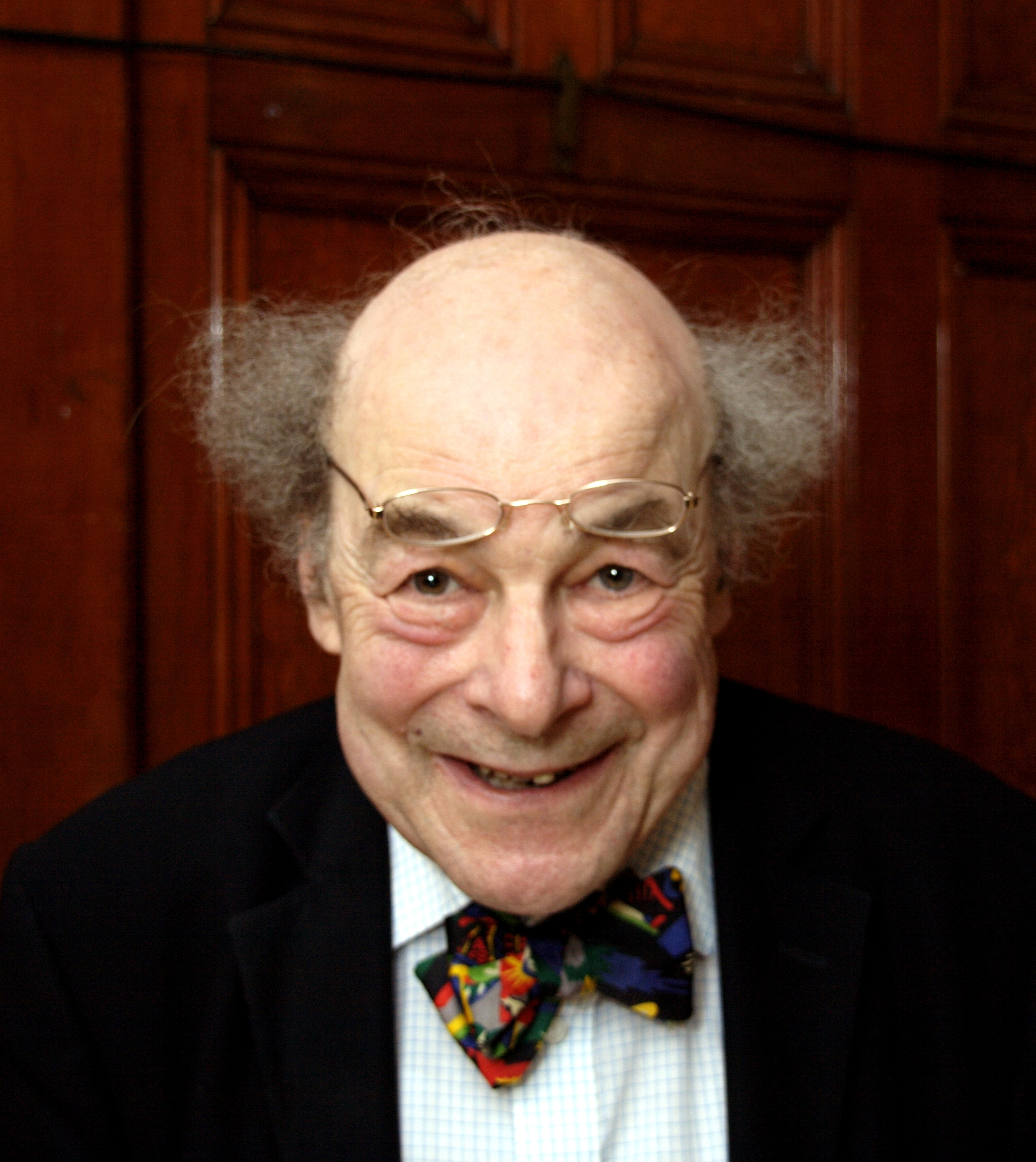
- Professor Heinz Wolff in 2010
- Born: Heinz Siegfried Wolff; 29 April 1928; Berlin, Germany
- Died: 15 December 2017 (aged 89); London, England
- Citizenship: British
- Education: University College London
- Scientific career
- Fields: Bioengineering
- Workplaces: Brunel University

Heinz Siegfried Wolff, FIEE, FRSA (29 April 1928 – 15 December 2017) was a German-born British scientist as well as a television and radio presenter. He was best known for the BBC television series The Great Egg Race.

== Early life ==
Wolff was born in Berlin on 29 April 1928. His father, Oswald Wolff, was a volunteer in World War I and a publisher specializing in German history. His mother, Margot Wolff (née Saalfeld) died "of an acute heart infection" in 1938. Father and son fled to the Netherlands in August 1939, and then arrived as Jewish refugees in Britain on 3 September 1939, on the same day that World War II was declared by Britain and France; Wolff was 11. He was educated at the City of Oxford High School for Boys.

== Career ==
Wolff worked in haematology at the Radcliffe Infirmary in Oxford under Robert Gwyn Macfarlane, where he invented a machine for counting patients' blood cells, before joining the Pneumoconiosis Research Unit at Llandough Hospital near Cardiff. He went on to University College London (UCL), where he gained a first class honours degree in physiology and physics. Before going to UCL, he had been considered by Trinity College, Cambridge, but was rejected twice because his understanding of Latin was too weak.

He spent much of his early career in bioengineering, a term he coined in 1954 to take account of recent advances in physiology. He became an honorary member of the European Space Agency in 1975, and in 1983 he founded the Brunel Institute for Bioengineering, which was involved in biological research during weightless spaceflight.

Following retirement, he was emeritus professor of bioengineering in Brunel University, working on a project aimed at addressing the care needs of elderly people. Wolff was the scientific director and co-founder of Project Juno, the private British-Soviet joint venture which sent Helen Sharman to the Mir space station.

He is credited with the invention of the gel pad electrodes used in ECGs.

== Popular science ==
A familiar face in the 1970s and early 1980s, well known to British television audiences with his memorable bow tie and pronounced German accent, his best remembered programme is The Great Egg Race. He was also the presenter of Great Experiments, and presenter/judge of the annual Young Scientists of the Year series. In 1985 he was a contestant on The Adventure Game.

Working with Heinz was like being at the centre of an ideas factory; he was fiercely curious and always had new avenues to explore.

— Gabriella Spinelli quoted by Joe Buchanunn, Brunel University, London

In June 1989 his death was wrongly reported in several newspapers, with a front-page story in The Sun and obituaries in The Independent and The Times. This happened because of confusion with the similarly named Dr. Heinz Hermann Wolff, a noted psychiatrist, who had died.

In 1989, he appeared on After Dark with, among others, astronaut Buzz Aldrin.

In 1998, he was one of the first people to be interviewed by Ali G, during that character's initial appearances on The 11 O'Clock Show, where the discussion ranged from elementary particles to penis enlargement.

In 2007, Wolff made a guest appearance on Channel 4's Comedy Lab episode "Karl Pilkington: Satisfied Fool", where he is seen explaining to Pilkington the sudden rise of intelligence in Homo sapiens.

In March 2009, he appeared in the puzzle video game Professor Heinz Wolff's Gravity.

For many years Professor Wolff was the President of Hampstead Scientific Society.

== Lectures ==
In 1975, he delivered the Royal Institution Christmas Lectures on Signals from the Interior. In 2005 he presented the Higginson Lecture at Durham University.

== Personal life and death ==
In 1953, he married Joan Stephenson, a staff nurse originally from Cardiff, whom he met at work. They lived in north London. Widowed in October 2014, he died from heart failure on 15 December 2017, at the age of 89. He was survived by his two sons, Anthony and Laurence.
