= Michael T. Wright (university administrator) =

Michael Thomas Wright
- Born: 11 April 1947
- Died: 10 January 2015 (aged 67)
- Scientific career
- Fields: Mechanical engineering
- Workplaces: Aston University

Michael Thomas Wright (11 April 1947 – 10 January 2015) was a British academic who was the Vice-Chancellor of Aston University between 1996 and 2006.

== Life ==
Wright was born 11 April 1947 and attended Sheldon Heath School, Birmingham. He took an apprenticeship then studied Electrical Engineering at Aston University, gaining a first class degree in 1969, and a PhD in 1972. Working in industry as an engineer, he rose to become director of several companies and returned as Professor of Mechanical Engineering in 1990. He was later Senior Pro-Vice-Chancellor, between 1994 and 1996, becoming Vice-Chancellor in 1996 for ten years. He retired in 2006 and died of cancer 10 January 2015. He was survived by his wife and daughter.

== Honours ==
FIEE 1981; FREng 1988; FIMechE 1989; FRSA 1989; CMath 1994; FIMA 1994; CCMI 1997. He received prizes for his published academic work: IEE Student Paper Award 1970, IEEE Petrochemical Industry Author Award 1981, IEE Power Division Premium for published work 1983.

Academic offices
Preceded by Frederick W. Crawford	Vice-Chancellor of Aston University; 1996–2006	Succeeded by Julia King
