= King Edward VI Sheldon Heath Academy =

Coordinates: 52.4689°N 1.7789°W

Location
- Sheldon Heath Road; Sheldon; Birmingham, West Midlands, B26 2RZ; England

Information
- Type: Academy
- Local authority: Birmingham City Council
- Department for Education URN: 136152 Tables
- Ofsted: Reports
- Principal: Becky Elcocks
- Gender: Mixed
- Age: 11 to 18
- Enrolment: 1,224 as of March 2016
- Website: http://www.keshacademy.com/academy/

King Edward VI Sheldon Heath Academy (KESH short) is a mixed secondary school and sixth form located in the Sheldon area of Birmingham, in the West Midlands of England.

Previously known as Sheldon Heath School, the school gained specialist status as an Arts College and was renamed Sheldon Heath Community Arts College. In September 2010 the school converted to academy status and was renamed King Edward VI Sheldon Heath Academy. The school moved into a new building in 2013.

It is a non-selective school which is sponsored by the Schools of King Edward VI in Birmingham Group. The group includes the grammar schools King Edward VI Aston School, King Edward VI Camp Hill School for Boys, King Edward VI Camp Hill School for Girls, King Edward VI Five Ways School and King Edward VI Handsworth School.

King Edward VI Sheldon Heath Academy offers GCSEs and BTECs as programmes of study for pupils, while students in the sixth form have the option to study from a range of A-levels and further BTECs.

== Notable former pupils ==
- Ian Atkins, football manager and former player
- Graham Lovett, former football player
- Michael Wright, former Vice-Chancellor of Aston University
- Nathan Redmond, football player
