= Higginson Lecture =

The Higginson Lecture is an annual lecture organised by and held at Durham University. The series was set up in recognition of Sir Gordon Higginson. Each year a leading engineer is selected to make a presentation, from their own perspective, on a topical issue in engineering.

Higginson gave the inaugural lecture himself in 1997. He then attended all of the lectures until 2009, 2 years before his death.

== Lecturers ==
- 1997 Gordon Higginson
- 1998 Robert Hawley
- 1999 Richard Hornby
- 2000 Ian Fells
- 2001 Kevin Warwick
- 2002 John Burland
- 2003 Mike Sterling
- 2004 Nick Cumpsty
- 2005 Heinz Wolff
- 2006 Julia King
- 2007 Nick Cooper
- 2008 Roderick Smith
- 2009 Peter Head
- 2010 Michael Robinson
- 2011 Roger Owen
- 2013 Warren East
- 2014 Paul Hawkins
- 2015 Duncan Dowson
- 2016 Rob Pieke
- 2017 Naomi Climer
- 2018 Ann Dowling
- 2019 Anthony Unsworth
- 2022 Paul Marsden
