= Naomi Climer =

British engineer

Naomi Wendy Climer CBE FREng FIET
- Born: 18 December 1964
- Scientific career
- Fields: Engineer

Naomi Wendy Climer, CBE, FREng, FIET (born 18 December 1964) is a British engineer who has worked in broadcast, media and communications technology chiefly at the BBC and Sony Professional Solutions, and was the first female President of the Institution of Engineering and Technology (IET). Climer is the co-founder and co-chair of the Institute for the Future of Work.

== Early life ==
Climer attended Gainsborough High School (now Queen Elizabeth High School) and Imperial College London, gaining a joint-degree in 1986 of Chemistry with Management Science.

== Career ==
Climer is a Non Executive Director on the Boards of Focusrite plc and Oxford Metrics plc, is a non executive on the Board of Sony UK Technology Centre and is co-founder and co-chair of the Institute for the Future of Work. She is a Fellow of the Royal Academy of Engineering (elected 2013). She was a Trustee of the Institution of Engineering and Technology from 2009–2017, Deputy President from 2012, President from Sept 2015^{[6]} and Immediate Past President from Sept 2016-Sept 2017. Climer was the subject of BBC Radio 4's The Life Scientific^{[7]} and promoted the importance of engineering and the need for diversity in engineering across numerous media appearances.^{[3][8][9][10][11]} Climer is a past chair of Council of the International Broadcasting Convention (IBC),

From 2012, she moved to California to be President of Sony's Media Cloud Services start-up business, returning to the UK in 2015 to take up the Presidency of the IET.

Climer joined Sony Professional Solutions Europe in 2002 as director of professional services and became vice president running the whole business from 2006 – 2012. During this time, she oversaw the move to new markets, the acquisition of Hawk-Eye for sports business, pushed Sony's sustainability agenda and started the 50:50 campaign for gender diversity.

Climer was director of technical operations from 2000 to 2002 of ITV Digital. ITV Digital ceased in June 2002, with Freeview being created in October 2002.

Climer joined the BBC in 1987 as an engineer, training in the same cohort as Kate Bellingham. She worked in BBC Broadcasting House and BBC World Service at Bush House before becoming Controller of Technology at BBC News. From 1998 to 2000, she was also a Director of the Parliamentary Broadcasting Unit.

From 2016 to 2017, Climer chaired the DCMS Future Communications Challenge Group,^{[4]} and was a commissioner on the independent commission on the Future of Work.^{[5]} She is currently on the UK Government's Science and Technology Awards Committee.

In 2020, Climer was vice-president of the Royal Academy of Engineering.

== Awards ==
Climer has been awarded honorary degrees from Huddersfield, Southampton Solent, Bradford and University of Wolverhampton.

In 2013, she was elected a Fellow of the Royal Academy of Engineering.

In 2014 she won the International Association of Broadcast Manufacturers (IABM) Broadcast Industry's Woman of the Year Award.

She was also named as one of the Top 50 Influential Women in Engineering in the UK by the Daily Telegraph and Women's Engineering Society (WES) 2016 and one of the top 50 most influential women in IT in the UK by Computer Weekly in 2015 and 2016.

In 2017 she presented the Higginson Lecture at Durham University.

She was appointed Commander of the Order of the British Empire (CBE) for services to services to the engineering profession in the 2018 Birthday Honours List.

Climer has one step-daughter.

Professional and academic associations
Preceded by Professor William Webb	President of the IET; September 2015 - September 2016	Succeeded by Professor Jeremy Watson
