= Crepelle =

Crepelle is a French manufacturer of compressors and engines. Founded as Crepelle and Company in 1837, it has a history going back to the early days of industrial engine manufacturing in France. Crepelle was acquired by the Swedish group Atlas Copco in 1997.

== History ==
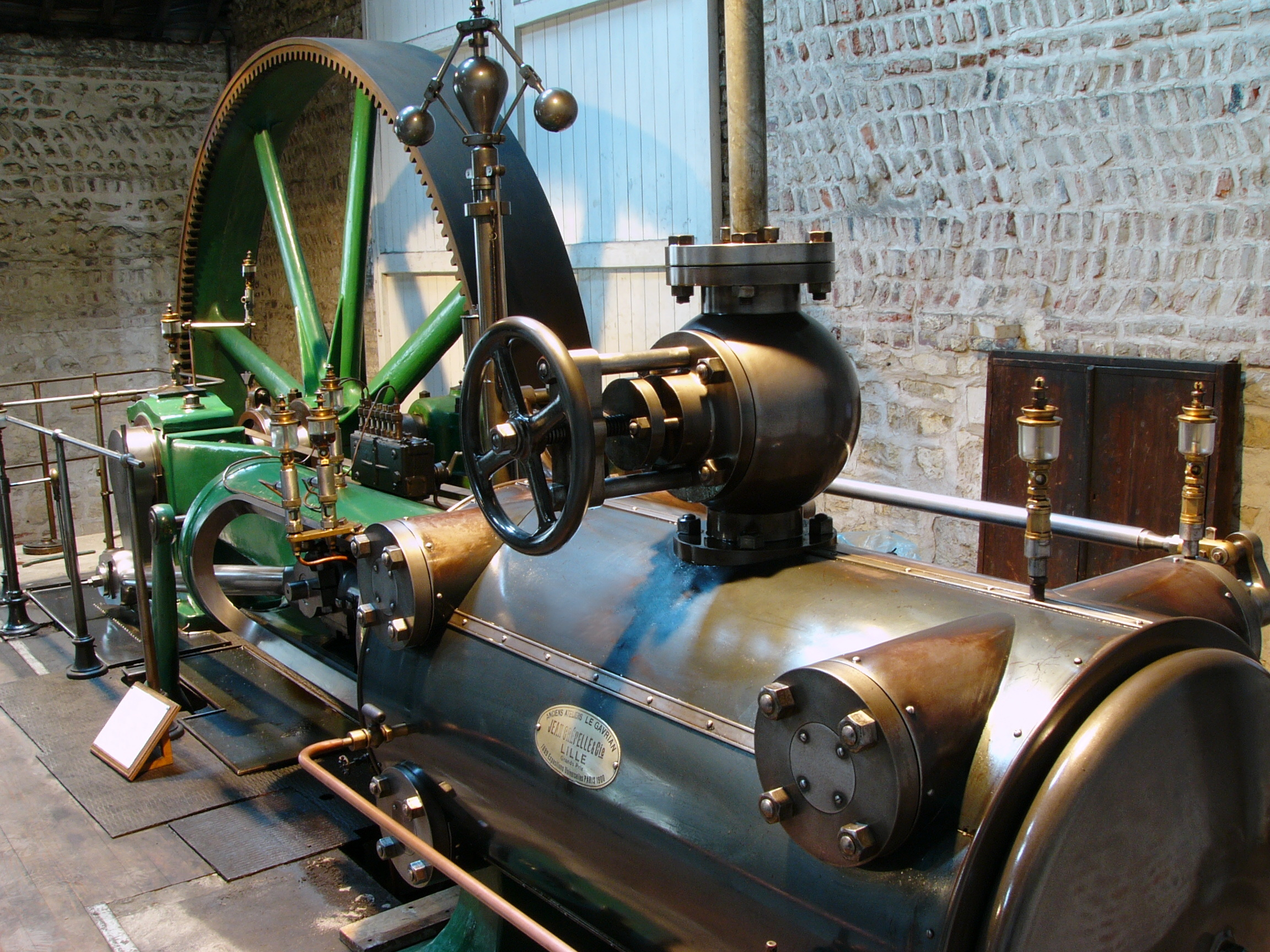
A Crepelle steam engine on exhibit at the Centre d'histoire sociale de Haute-Normandie in Rouen, France.

Founded in 1837 in Lille, France, the company was an early innovator of steam engine technology. The company became Crepelle and Garand in the late 19th century. The company's steam engines were to be found in many steam ships operating in the 19th century. The company later produced diesel (oil) engines and compressors, introducing its first gas compressors in 1930.

Several examples of the industrial engines produced by Crepelle in the 19th century survive. One notable example is a large 1889 Corliss valve horizontal single cylinder steam engine. From 1974 until 2006, it was on exhibit at the British Engineerium museum in West Blatchington, Brighton and Hove, East Sussex, United Kingdom. This engine won a gold medal at the 1889 Paris Exhibition. The engine is a restored working engine. It was used to generate electricity for a hospital in France until 1940.
