= British Engineerium =

Museum in Hove, East Sussex, UK

The British Engineerium
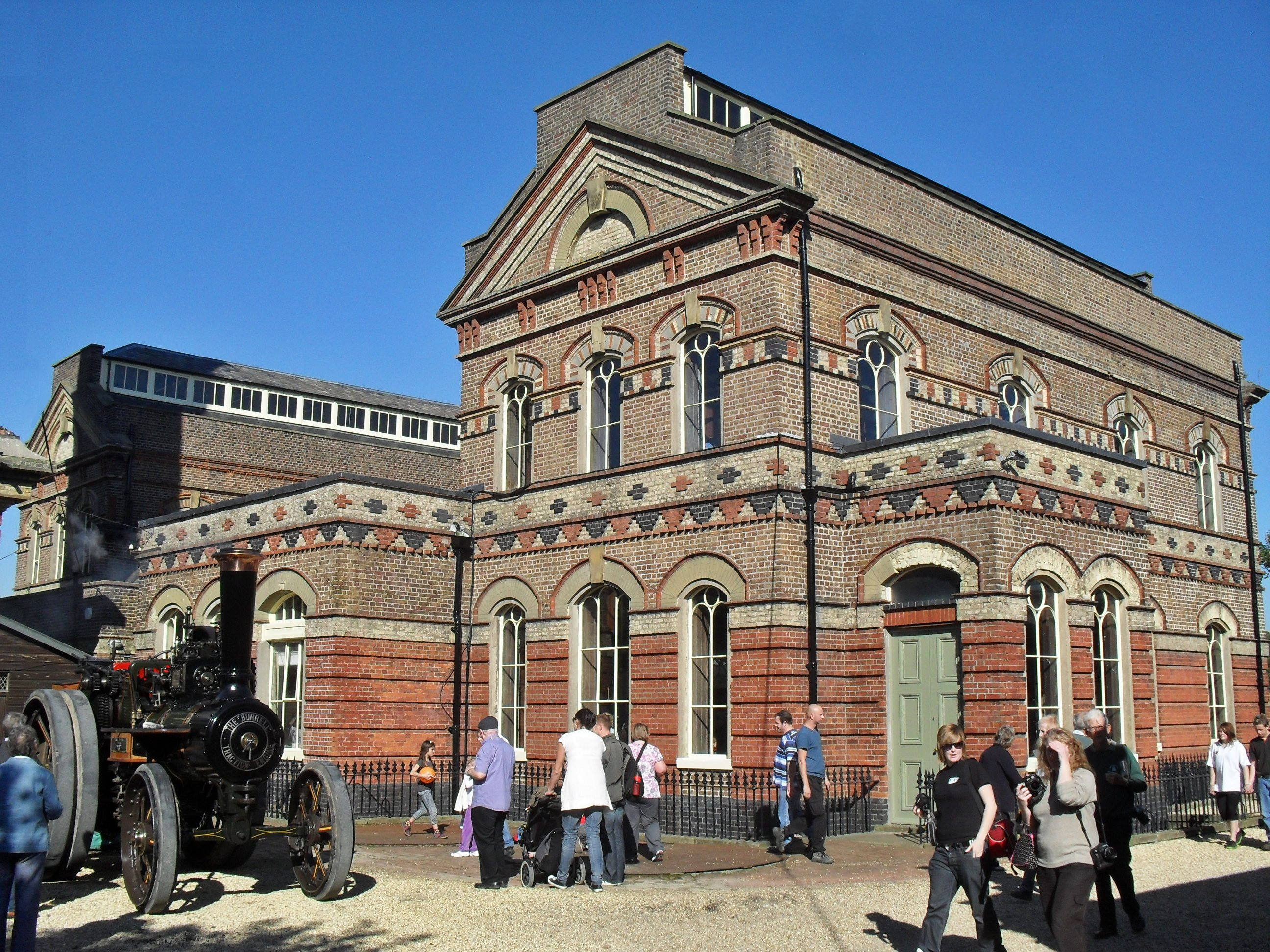
- The former boiler house and engine rooms from the southeast

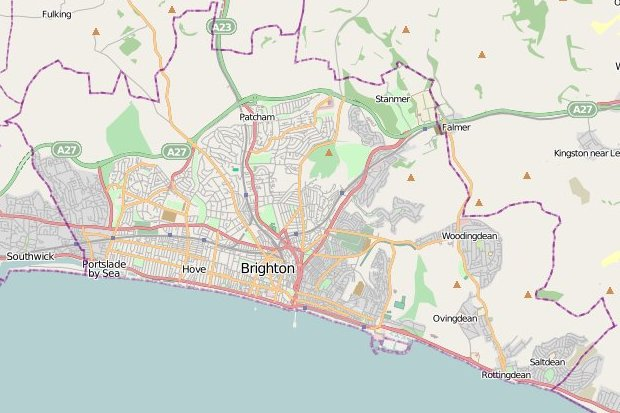
- Location within Brighton and Hove
- 50.8442°N 0.1758°W
- Location: The Droveway, West Blatchington, Brighton and Hove, East Sussex, United Kingdom BN3 7QA

History
- Built: 1866
- Built for: Brighton Hove and Preston Constant Service Water Supply Company

Site notes
- Architectural style: High Victorian Gothic

Listed Building – Grade II*
- Official name: Boiler and Engine House at British Engineerium; Chimney 2 metres south of the Boiler and Engine House at British Engineerium
- Designated: 7 June 1971
- Reference no.: 1187600; 1292285

Listed Building – Grade II
- Official name: Cooling Pond and Leat at British Engineerium; Former Coal Shed at British Engineerium; Walls enclosing British Engineerium
- Designated: 7 June 1971
- Reference no.: 1187601; 1210170; 1298616

The British Engineerium (formerly Brighton and Hove Engineerium) is an engineering and steam power museum in Hove, East Sussex. It is housed in the Goldstone Pumping Station, a set of High Victorian Gothic buildings started in 1866. The Goldstone Pumping Station supplied water to the local area for more than a century before it was converted to its present use. The site has been closed to the public since 2006, and in March 2018 the entire complex was put up for sale.

At its greatest extent, between 1884 and 1952, the complex consisted of two boiler houses with condensing engines, a chimney, coal cellars, workshop, cooling pond, leat, and an underground reservoir. Situated on top of a naturally fissured chalk hollow, it provided vast quantities of water to the rapidly growing towns of Hove and its larger neighbour, the fashionable seaside resort of Brighton, for more than a century. As new sources of water were found elsewhere and more modern equipment installed to exploit them, the pumping station's importance declined, and by 1971 the Brighton Corporation Water Department had closed it and threatened the complex with demolition. An industrial archaeologist offered to restore the buildings and machinery in return for a lease from the Brighton Corporation Waterworks, and a charitable trust was formed to enable this. Expertise developed by the Engineerium's employees and volunteers was exploited across the world: they founded museums, undertook restoration projects and trained young people in engineering heritage conservation. Another enthusiast subsequently bought the complex, and as of 2026 it is closed to the public while more restoration and extension work takes place.

The High Victorian Gothic buildings are a landmark in Hove, and are a good example of the 19th-century ethos that "utility definitely does not equal dullness" in industrial buildings. Polychrome brickwork, moulded dressings and facings, decorative gables and elaborate windows characterise all the structures – even the 95-foot (29 m) chimney, which stands apart from the main buildings like a campanile. English Heritage has listed the complex for its architectural and historical importance, giving its structures five separate listings: the former boiler house and the chimney are both listed at Grade II* – the second-highest designation – and the former coal shed, the cooling pond and leat and the tall flint and brick wall surrounding the site each have the lower Grade II status.

As well as the restored pumping station equipment, the complex has a wide range of exhibits: more than 1,500 were in place less than a year after it opened. These include a 19th-century horse-drawn fire engine, traction engines, veteran motorcycles, Victorian household equipment and old tools. A French-built horizontal steam engine dating from 1859 is the principal exhibit. Until its closure in 2006, the Engineerium used its exhibits to educate and promote the study of industrial history: it has been called "the world's only centre for the teaching of engineering conservation", and was central to the activities of the English Industrial Heritage Year in 1993. For many years, the larger and indigenous exhibits were fully operational and in steam at weekends.

== History ==
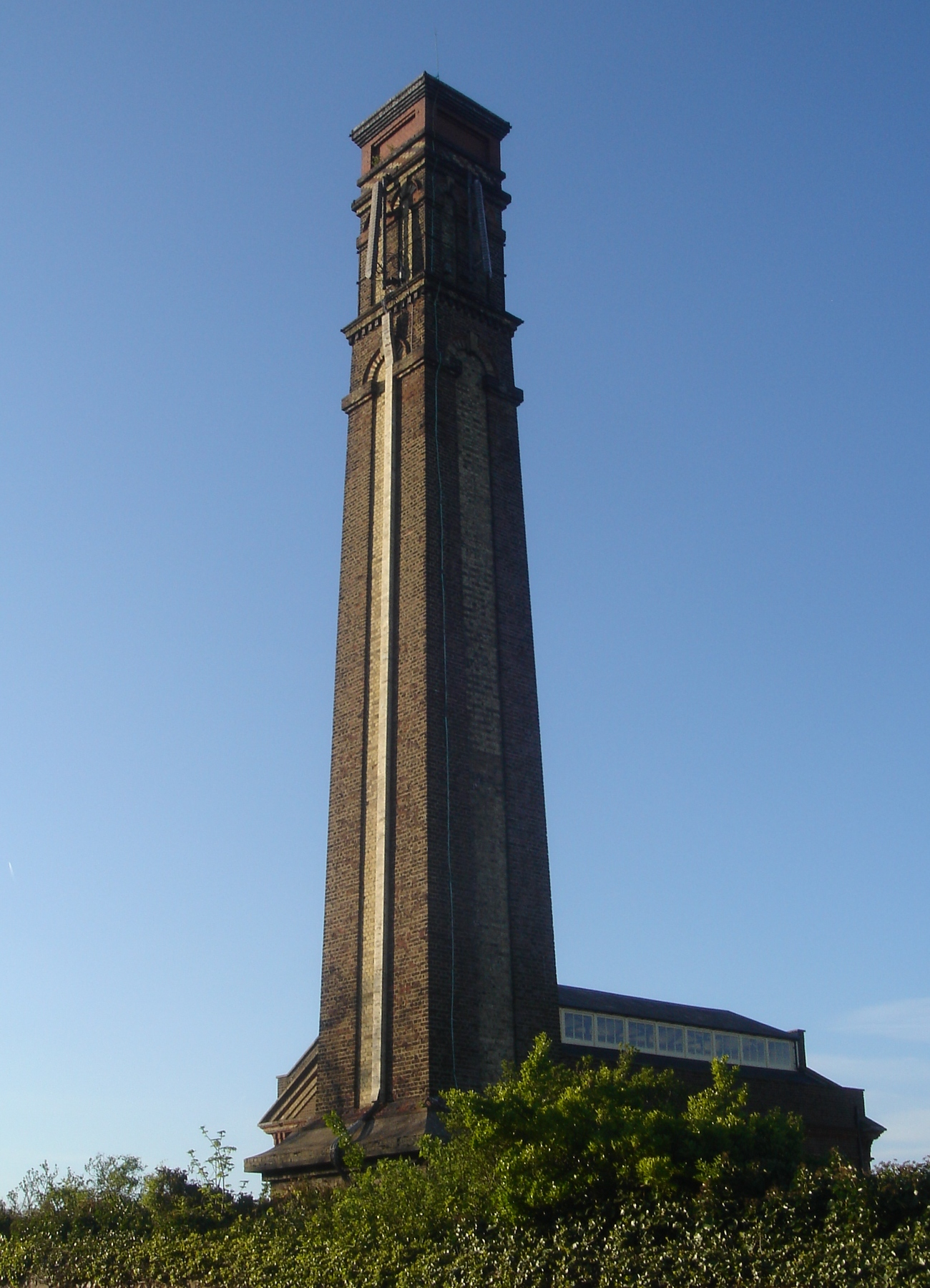
The chimney at the former pumping station is 95 feet (29 m) tall.

Brighton and neighbouring Hove, on the English Channel coast between the South Downs and the sea, were built on top of a vast aquifer of chalk. A regular supply of naturally pure water was always available from this natural reservoir, and in the settlements' early days many wells were sunk to exploit it. The rapid growth of Brighton in the 18th and early 19th century, followed by similar expansion in Hove, put pressure on the local authorities to provide more sources and a better supply system, though: wells became increasingly contaminated by sewage from cesspits, and some had to be blocked because they were so polluted, reducing the two towns' water supply further. The first local water company—the Brighton, Hove and Preston Waterworks Company—was founded on 16 June 1834 by means of an act of Parliament, the Brighthelmston, Hove and Preston Water Act 1834 (4 & 5 Will. 4. c. lxii); it built a waterworks on the road to Lewes and provided piped water for two hours per day to a few wealthy customers. This facility had two 20-horsepower beam engines.

By the 1850s, more water was needed for the continually expanding population: the intermittent supply from the Lewes Road waterworks was the only alternative to wells and boreholes. In 1853, a new company was formed with the aim of introducing a large-scale, consistent supply to Brighton, Hove and surrounding villages. The Brighton, Hove and Preston Constant Service Waterworks Company bought its predecessor, the Brighton, Hove and Preston Waterworks Company, in 1854. By the time it was in turn acquired by Brighton Corporation in 1872 (by means of another act of Parliament, the Brighton Corporation Waterworks Act 1872 (35 & 36 Vict. c. lxxxvi)), it was pumping 2,600,000 imperial gallons (12,000,000 L) per day to 18,000 houses in Brighton, Hove and the surrounding villages of Falmer, Hangleton, Ovingdean, Patcham, Preston and Rottingdean.

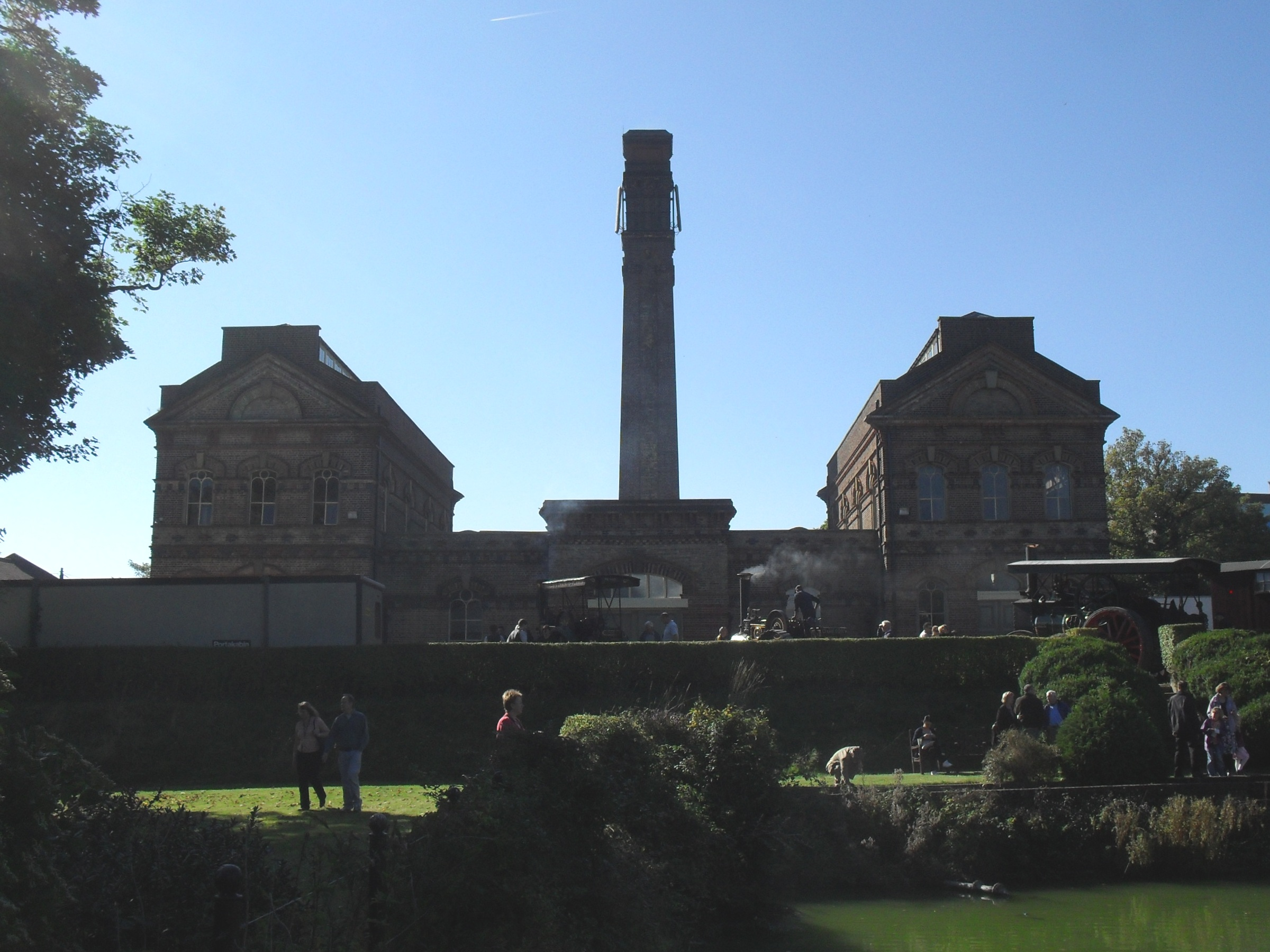
The two engine rooms (seen from the rear, with the cooling pond in the foreground) flank the boiler house.

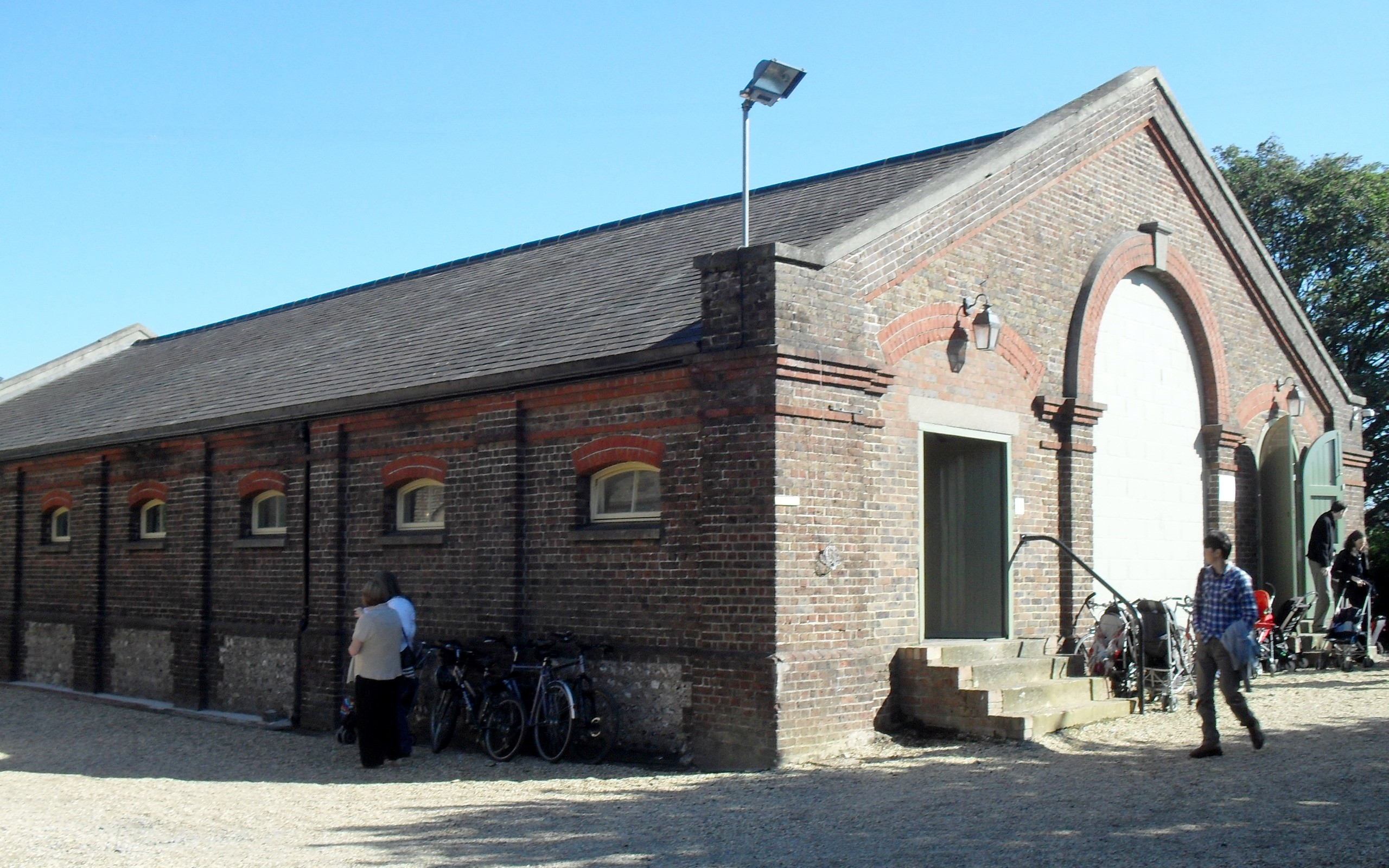
This coal storage shed was added to the complex in 1875.

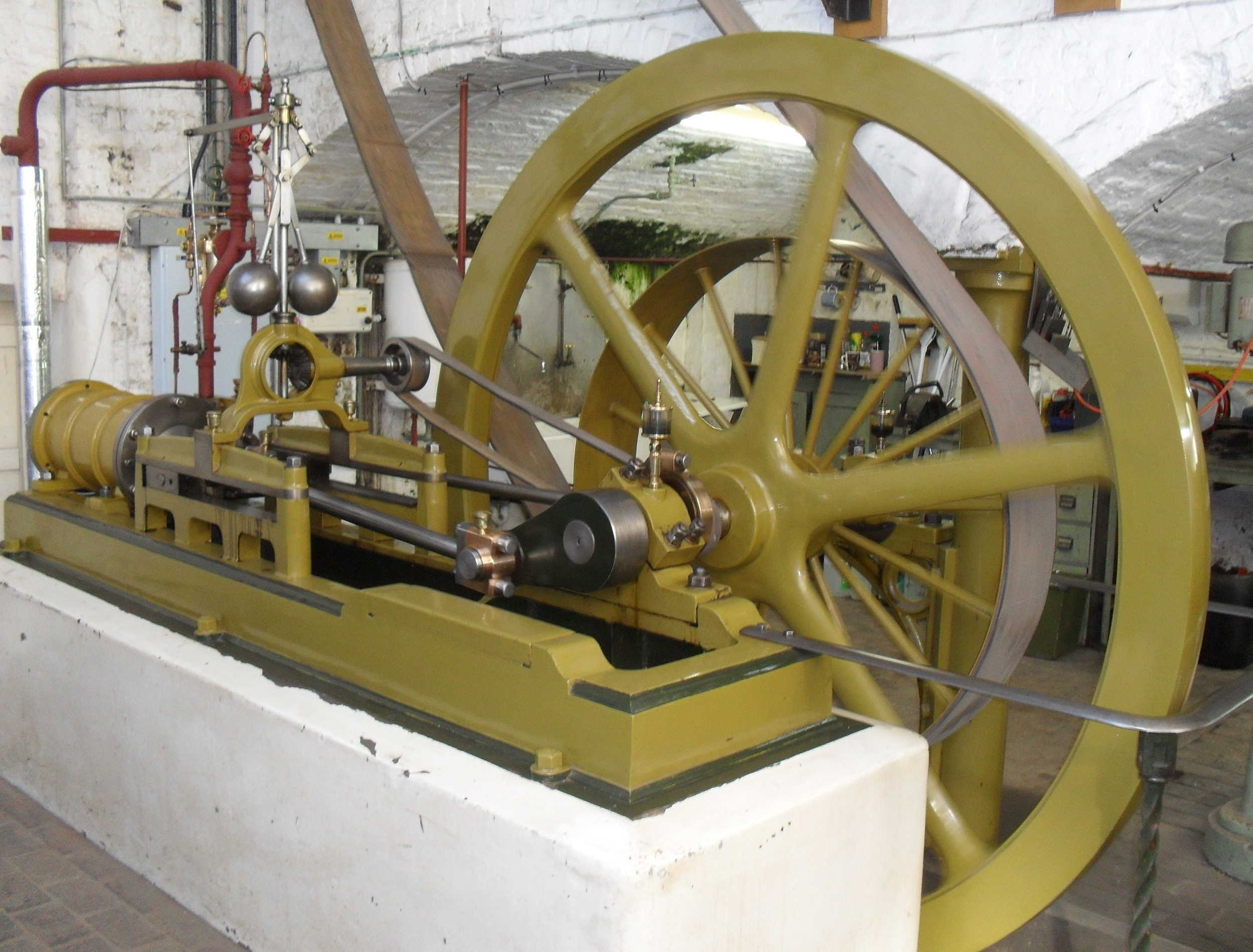
The on-site workshop had its own steam engine.

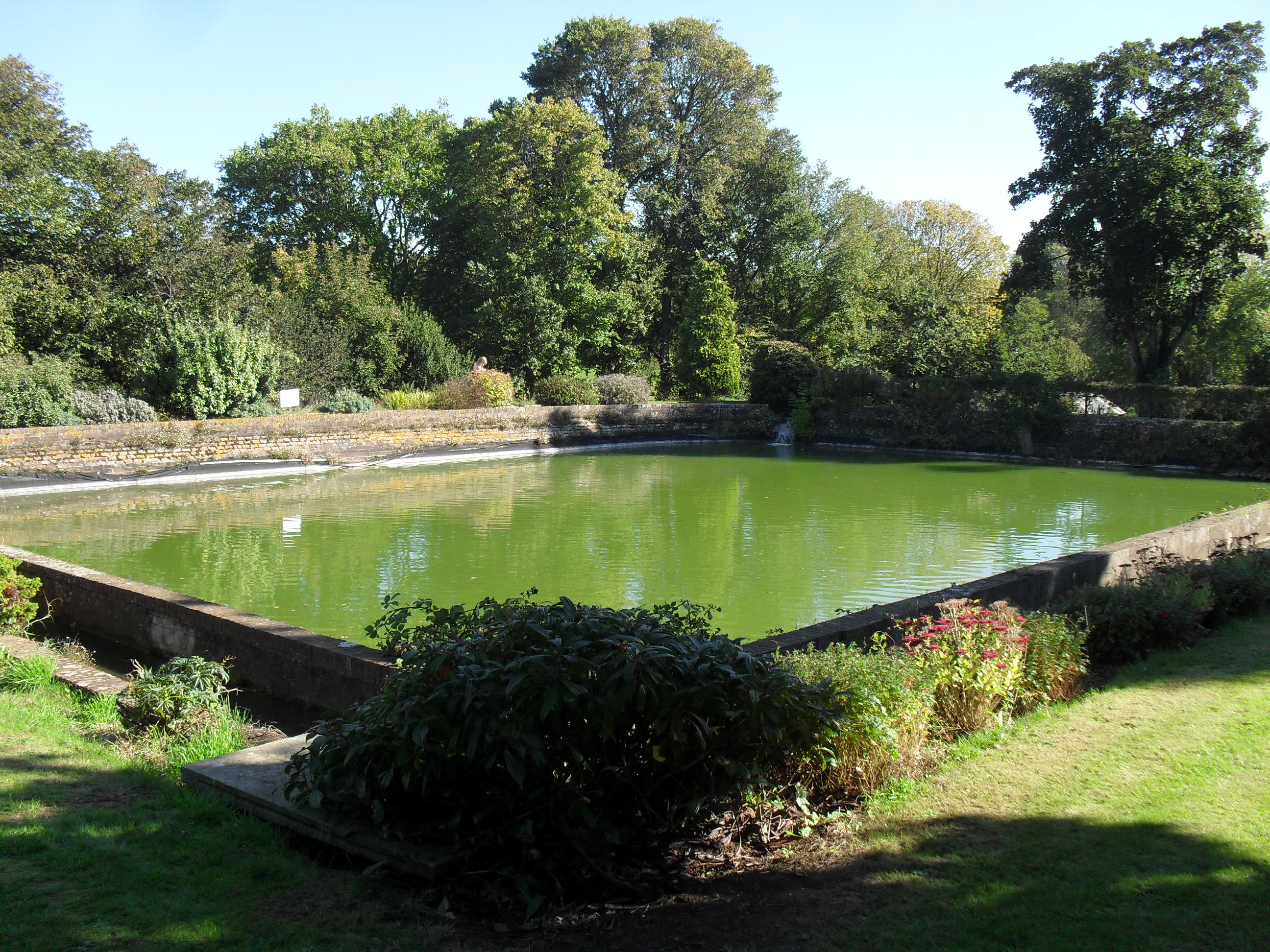
A cooling pond and leat were built behind the main buildings in 1884.

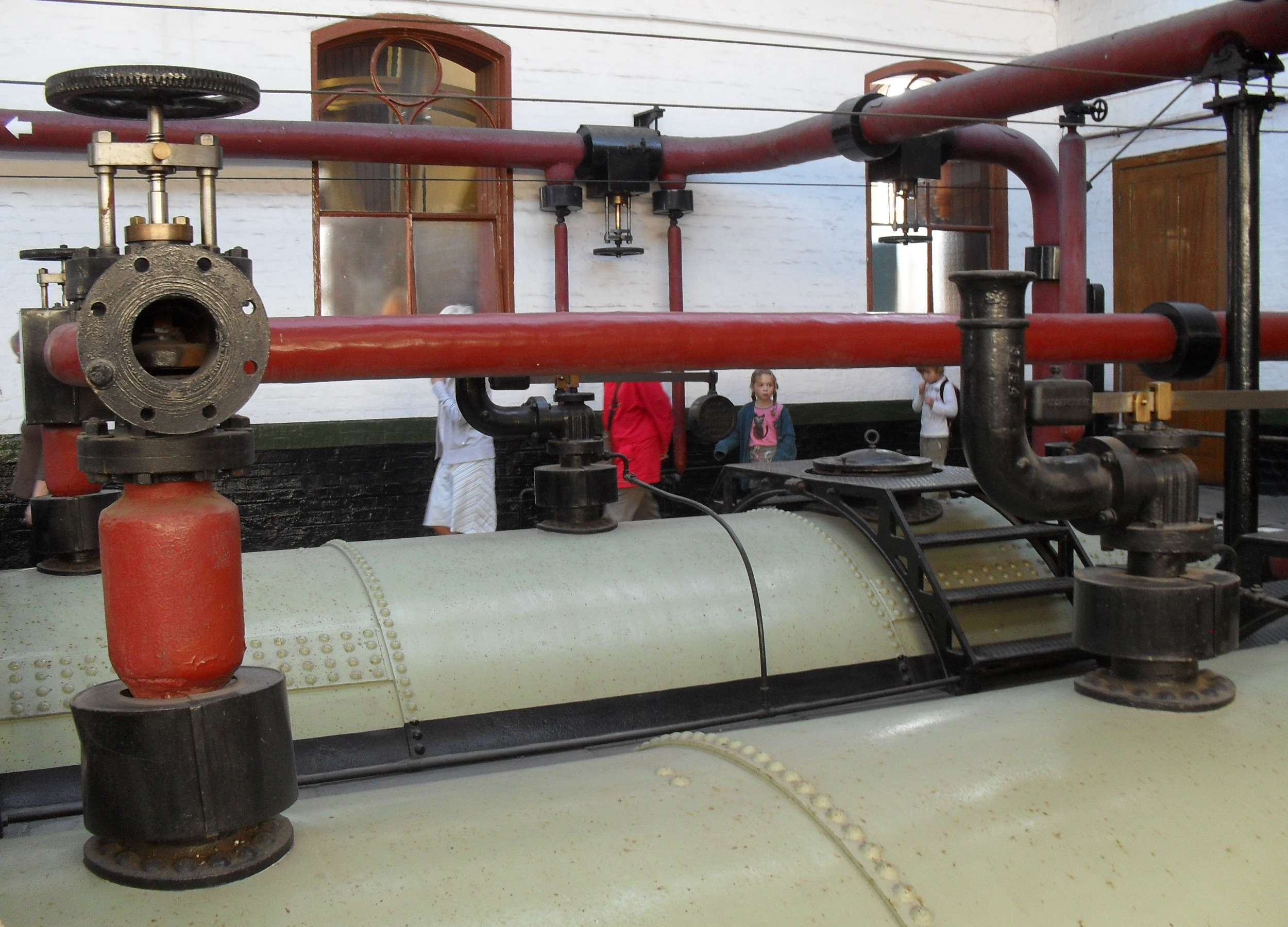
Two of the four Lancashire boilers were restored in 1975–76.

The company employed eminent civil engineer Thomas Hawksley to find a suitable site for a new pumping station. Hawksley built more waterworks than any of his Victorian counterparts: he oversaw more than 150 schemes in Britain and abroad. In 1858, he advised the company that the shallow chalk valley at Goldstone Bottom, at the south end of West Blatchington village just outside Hove, would be a good candidate for exploratory drilling. Test wells were sunk, and confirmed his impression. The company bought the 3.5 acres (1.4 ha) of land in 1862, and in 1865 it was granted permission to build a pumping station on the site. By this stage, the Lewes Road facility was suffering from pollution, and the opening of another pumping station at Falmer and the building of more reservoirs had not been sufficient to satisfy demand.

Work took place during 1866, and the facility opened in that year with the name Goldstone Pumping Station. The Brighton, Hove and Preston Constant Service Waterworks Company operated it until its acquisition by Brighton Corporation. In its original form, the complex consisted of a boiler house and adjacent engine room, coal cellars and a chimney described by one historian as "truly monumental", all built of polychrome brick. The engine room housed a 120-horsepower beam engine made by Charles Amos of London-based manufacturer Easton and Amos. It was a compound engine of the type patented by engineer Arthur Woolf. Water was drawn from a 160-foot (49 m) well which started immediately below the engine, which was known as the "Number 1 Engine". It was driven by three Lancashire boilers with twin furnaces, which were fed by two coal cellars. Up to 130,000 imperial gallons (590,000 L) of water could be pumped per hour.

In 1872, ownership of Goldstone Pumping Station and all other water facilities in the Brighton area passed to Brighton Corporation, which formed a new committee called the Brighton Corporation Waterworks to operate them. Demand for water continued to rise, so in 1876 the corporation undertook a major expansion of the pumping station. A second engine room was added, and a separate coal storage shed was built in the grounds. Workshop facilities were also provided, with a range of machine tools, forge, lathe and planer and a separate Easton and Amos steam engine, apparently left over from The Great Exhibition. The new engine house was equipped with the "Number 2 Engine"—a 250-horsepower Woolf compound unit built by the firm of Easton and Anderson and with a pumping capacity of 150,000 imperial gallons (680,000 L) per hour. It was powered by three more Lancashire boilers. Mayor of Brighton Henry Abbey fired up the engine for the first time on 26 October 1876; his visit, with members of the Water Corporation committee, was recorded on a plaque in the engine room. A network of arched tunnels were built to link the new coal shed, the workshop and the firing platform of the boiler room. The subterranean passages were used by coal trucks.

The next extension took place in 1884. A cooling pond and a leat (an artificial waterway) were built on land behind the pumping station, and a new 1,500,000-imperial-gallon (6,800,000 L) underground reservoir was built by J. T. Chappell. It ran for 1/2 mile (0.8 km) westwards from the complex. Brighton Corporation Waterworks spent £11,000 on this work and on the building of two other reservoirs in Brighton, at Dyke Road and Race Hill. All three were built of tile, brick and Portland cement. They were constantly replenished by a 1,000-imperial-gallon (4,500 L)-per-minute inflow from numerous natural fissures in the chalk.

Because the surrounding area became substantially urbanised in the interwar period, the water was treated with ozone from 1937 to disinfect it. Meanwhile in 1934, the boilers powering the Number 2 Engine were replaced by four new models of the same type, built by the Blackburn-based Yates and Thom company. Their capacity was greater: they could each generate 6,000 pounds-force (27,000 N) of steam per hour. The pumping station soon went into decline, though. Electric pumps became available in the 1940s, and one was installed in the Number 1 Engine room; the engine itself was decommissioned at that time. The four new Lancashire boilers were in full-time use for only 18 years: Number 2 Engine was taken out of service in 1952, although it was maintained for a further two years in case it was required. Several pumping stations had been newly built or rebuilt since World War II—at Aldrington, Falmer, Mile Oak, Newmarket Down (near Lewes), Patcham and Sompting—and the old Lewes Road source, closed in 1903 because of pollution, came back into use. The corporation increased its supplies further by acquiring waterworks in Peacehaven and Lewes in the 1950s. The Goldstone Pumping Station was considered outdated and no longer required, and in 1971 the corporation announced plans to build a small electric pumphouse on the site, demolish the 19th-century buildings and scrap the steam-era equipment.

Jonathan Minns, a London-based steam and engineering expert, immediately set about trying to save the buildings and their contents. He applied to the Historic Buildings Council for England (the forerunner of the present English Heritage body) for listed status to be granted to the buildings in the complex. This was granted on 17 June 1971, and in the following year the Department of the Environment issued a preservation order preventing demolition or significant alteration of the buildings. Minns acquired the lease of the complex in 1974, and planned to restore it from its derelict state and establish an industrial museum and educational centre. He also set up a trust to run it. By this time, the complex had a new owner: the Water Act 1973 restructured the water industry in England and Wales, transferring ownership of water infrastructure from local authorities to 10 government-controlled regional companies. Brighton Corporation Waterworks became part of the Southern Water Authority, and it was this entity which granted the lease to Minns.

Minns had only £350 when he started work on the Engineerium, but more money soon arrived in the form of grants and donations. The Southern Water Authority gave the trust £22,000, the Department of the Environment granted £40,000, and the trust received the largest historic buildings grant awarded in Sussex up to that point in 1975. In October of that year, Minns and eight volunteers began to restore the complex and its machinery, which were in a state of disrepair. The boiler house and Number 2 Engine were the priority, but before they could be started the workshop had to be repaired so that its equipment could be used to carry out the necessary work elsewhere.

The boiler house and Number 2 Engine were in a particularly bad condition: the roof was wrecked, the metal fixtures were corroded, moss was growing on exposed surfaces and the boilers were not operational. Number 2 Engine had not been steamed since 1954, and had to be taken apart and rebuilt while the building was restored around it. Every moving part was cleaned by hand, and the exterior was repainted in its correct colour after the original paintwork was discovered under layers of mould and rust. The eight men worked for about six months on these tasks; Number 2 Engine was successfully fired up again on 14 March 1976 after the two renovated Lancashire boilers were tested and inspected by safety officials (the other two were left in their unrestored state).

The complex was first opened to the public on Good Friday 1976. The official reopening, on 26 October 1976 (exactly 100 years after Number 2 Engine was first fired up), came after the coal store was converted into an exhibition and educational area. At this time, it was named the Brighton and Hove Engineerium; the complex was given its present name on 30 May 1981. By this time, about 1,500 exhibits were on display, and the boilers and Number 2 Engine were fired up every weekend. The cost of running the Engineerium and employing 18 people (including six professional engineers) was running at about £250,000 per year. Although the Southern Water Authority, which still owned the site, paid for improvements in 1983, and grants came in from East Sussex County Council and Hove Borough Council, there was no financial backing from central government—although the Engineerium was acknowledged as a national and international leader in industrial heritage and "the world's only centre for the teaching of engineering conservation". (Employees of the Engineerium have helped to set up or renovate more than 20 similar institutions across the world, and it was designated as England's South East Regional Centre during Industrial Heritage Year in 1993.) The centre's second royal visit, by the Duke of Kent in 1993, coincided with a fundraising plea for £4 million, to be spent on extensions to the exhibition space and workshop; Minns also applied unsuccessfully for a National Lottery grant. Vodafone paid for the right to attach a mobile phone mast to the chimney, though.

Ongoing funding problems caused the Engineerium to close in 2006, and the complex and its contents were put up for auction by Bonhams. The inventory was split into hundreds of separate lots, and the buildings themselves were valued at £1.25 million. Just before the auction was due to begin, a local businessman and enthusiast offered £2 million for the buildings and more than £1 million for the contents conditional on his being donated half of the Minns Collection. This was accepted, and on 10 May 2006 the Engineerium Trust assets passed into Mike Holland's ownership.

The Engineerium stayed shut while its new owner invested in improvements and extensions. In February 2010, he stated that he expected the Engineerium to reopen within a year. On 10 October 2010, it was opened for a day to raise money for charity; the Number 2 Engine was demonstrated and many steam engines and other exhibits from the museum's own collection and from outside were on display. In August 2011, Brighton and Hove City Council approved a planning application for some renovation and remodelling work, including an extension. Structural engineers found that part of the building was in poor condition, and in January 2012 a further application was submitted to seek permission to demolish and rebuild part of the machine room. General restoration work began in October 2012, supported by a second open day.

Jonathan Minns died on 13 October 2013, aged 75. Two years later, an arson attack damaged the chimney. In 2017 the owner, Mike Holland, was sent to prison for manslaughter by gross negligence. In March 2018 the entire complex was put up for sale.

== Architecture ==
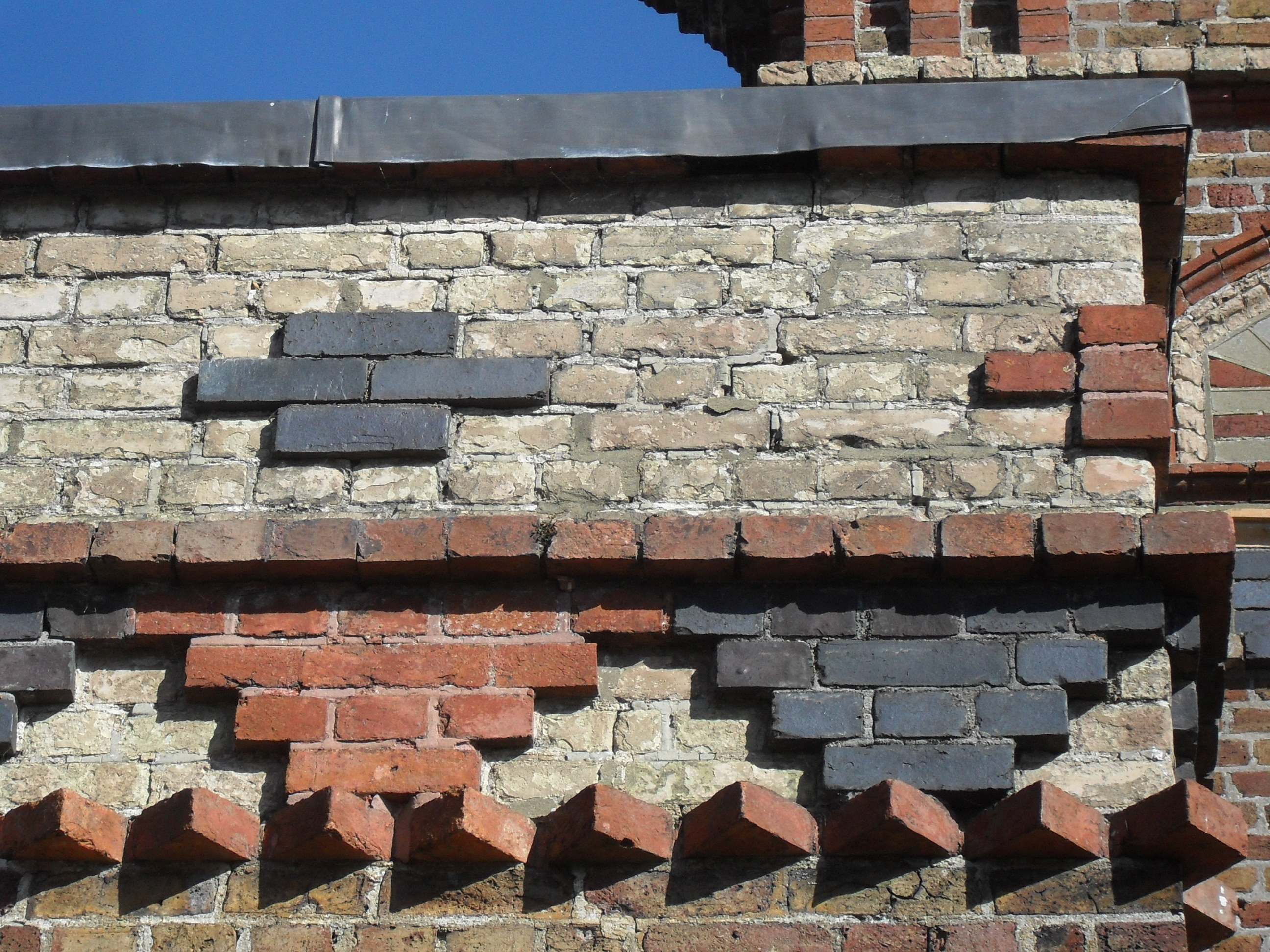
The walls have multi-coloured, multi-layered brickwork.

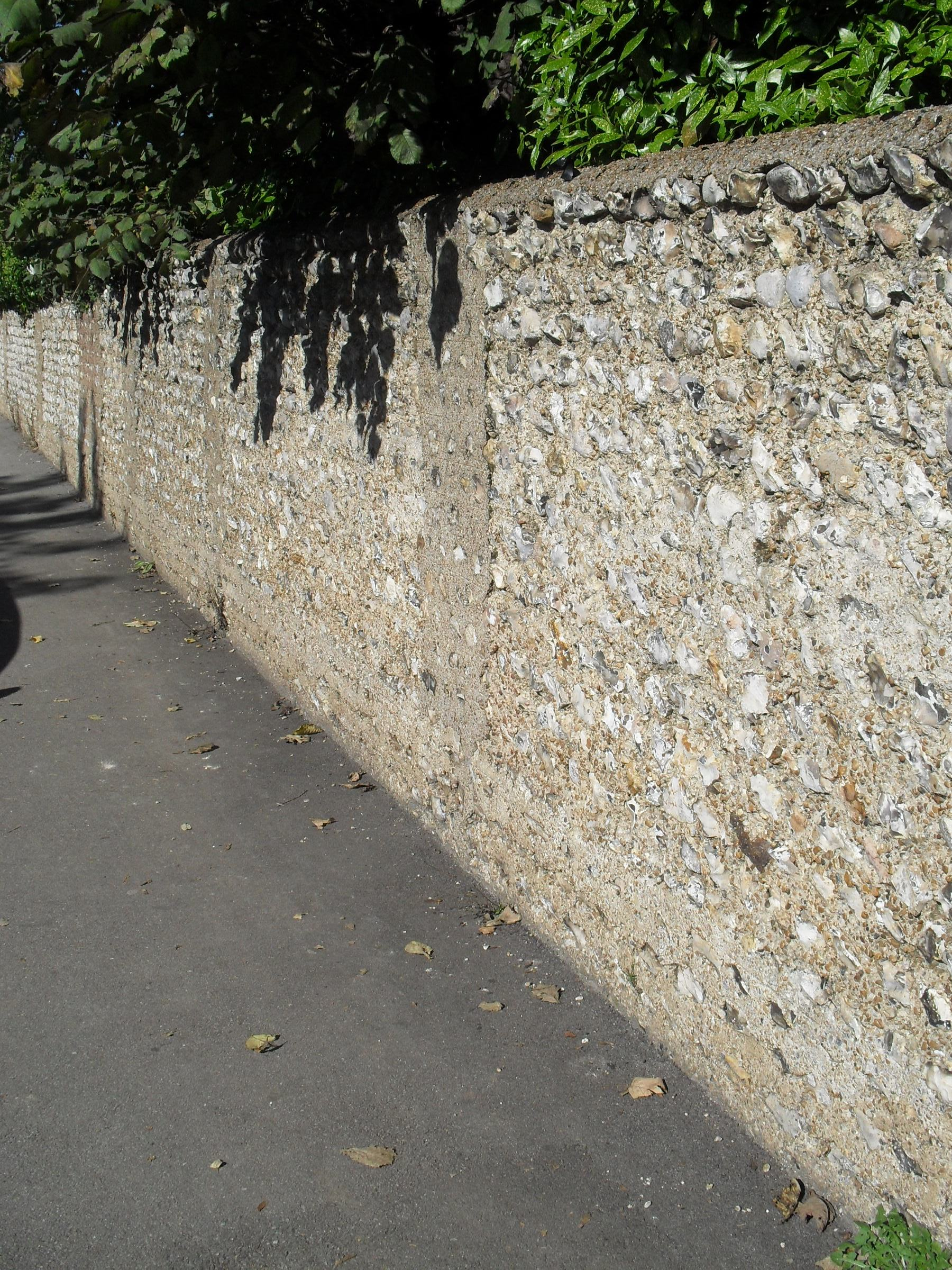
Coursed flint walls surround the Engineerium.

The Engineerium has been described by Brighton historian Clifford Musgrave as an "unusually fine asset" for Brighton and Hove and by fellow historian Ken Fines "a splendid example of Victorian industrial engineering". The buildings have intricately patterned polychrome brickwork, and the 95-foot (29 m) chimney to the south is also finely detailed and is a landmark in Hove. Both the buildings and the machinery inside demonstrate the widespread belief among Victorian designers and architects that every object and building, no matter how commonplace or humble, should be elaborately and expansively embellished.

On the main buildings, the walls consist of bands of red, yellow and purplish-blue brick with moulded layers and coping. The ground floor has red brickwork with a rusticated appearance. The cast-iron windows are set in round-arched openings below a string course which runs around the whole building and consists of alternate patterns of red and black brick. The slate roof has flat-topped gables set above pediments at the top of each engine room. The two engine rooms are two-storey and have a three-bay, three-window range; they flank the single-storey boiler room which also has three bays. The left- and right-hand bays are recessed; all have windows that are similar to those of the engine rooms.

The chimney stands about 7 feet (2.1 m) south of the engine rooms and boiler house. The rectangular, campanile-style structure stands on a rusticated base with a tapering plinth below it. Above this is a moulded cornice. The chimney itself tapers slightly and has tall arched panels on each face, forming slight recesses. An entablature runs all the way round, linking these. The brickwork is of the same colours and detailing as the other buildings.

The former coal shed (now the exhibition hall) and its attached workshops are of red and brown brick with coping on the walls and a shallow slate roof. The workshops, which do not contribute to the architectural interest of the building, are a perpendicular adjunct to the rear of the coal shed, so the building has an overall L-shape. Sloping land gives the building a single storey at the front (north) end and a second lower storey towards the rear. The three-bay north façade has three arched entrances; the smaller flanking pair have replacement doors.

Standing in the grounds behind the complex, the cooling pond measures 1,100 square feet (100 m^{2}) and has a leat around three sides; it opens out on the southwest side. It is surrounded by small walls of red brick and terracotta. Pipework connects the leat to the boiler house, from which hot water flows; heat exchange takes place in the cooling pond; and cold water is returned to be used in the boilers.

Tall flint and brick walls, dating from 1866, surround the complex on all sides. Small flints laid in courses form the main building material on three sides. Other parts have red brickwork with inset flints, and the main entrance has red-brick piers with knapped flintwork. There are also iron railings and gates with the fleur-de-lis emblem. The walls have recesses on the inside and outside at irregular intervals; one on the outside of the south wall contains a drinking fountain with a panel imploring users to commit no nuisance. Flints are prevalent in this downland area; so many were found when the pumping station was built that the contractors fashioned them into a deliberately ancient-looking folly on the southwest corner of the engine rooms.

== Exhibits ==
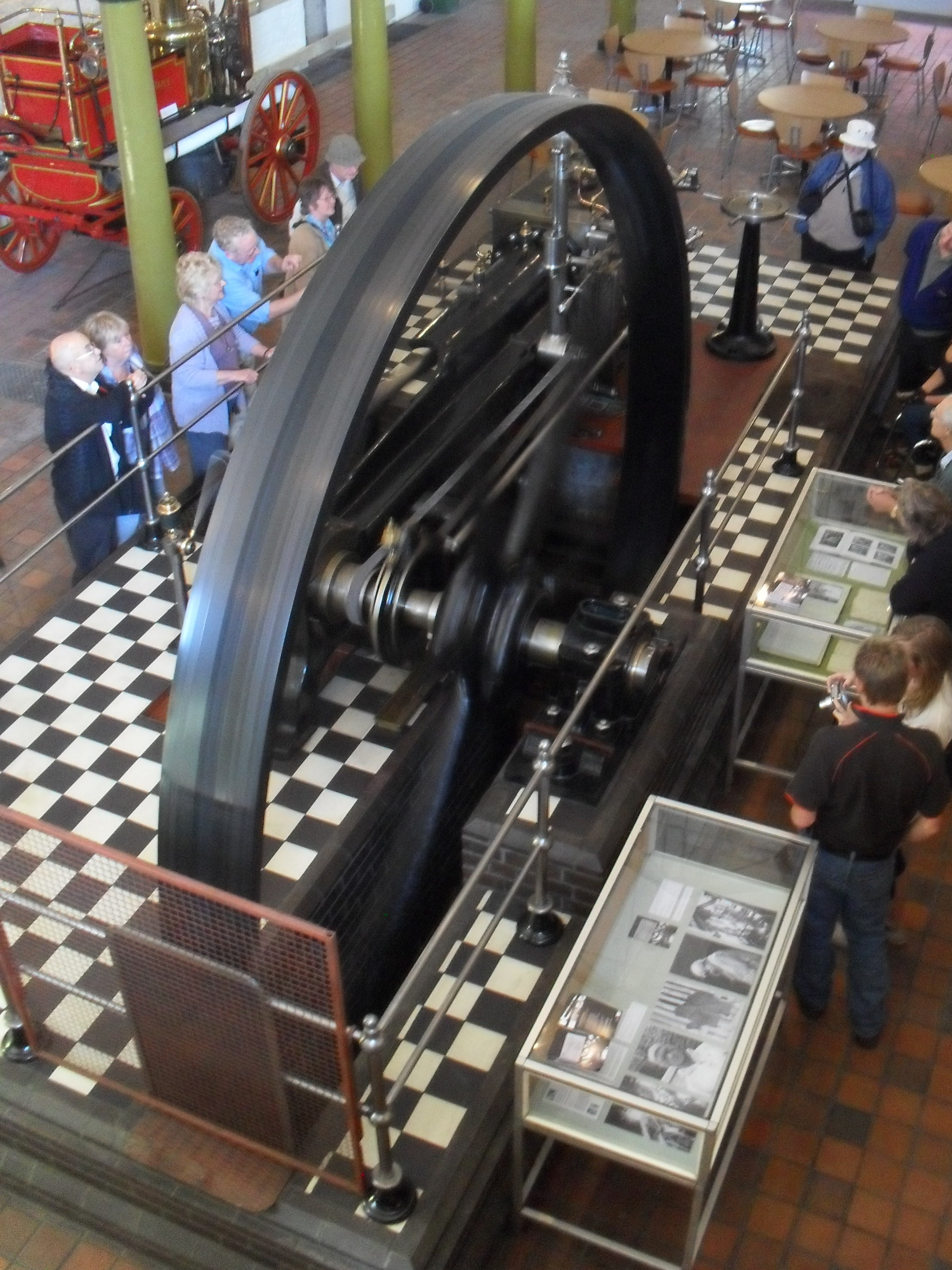
The Engineerium has a Corliss steam engine dating from 1859.

The Engineerium has hundreds of exhibits relating to the history of engineering and steam power. Many are on display in the exhibition hall, which occupies the former coal storage shed. The central feature of the hall is a Corliss steam engine built in France in 1859. American inventor George Henry Corliss patented the design in 1849 and became president of The Corliss Steam Engine Company. The valve gear he invented improved the efficiency of horizontal reciprocating engines more than any other innovation. The Engineerium's example was assembled in 1859 by the Lille-based company Crepelle & Grand. It was shown at the Exposition Universelle in Paris in 1889, where it won first prize. It was then used for more than 50 years at L'Hôpital Émile-Roux in Limeil-Brévannes. It was bought by Jonathan Minns, taken apart, brought to the Engineerium and reassembled in 1975. The engine can generate 91 horsepower; its 13-foot (4.0 m), 4-long-ton (4.1 t) flywheel turns 80 times a minute; and the whole machine weighs 16 long tons (16.3 t).

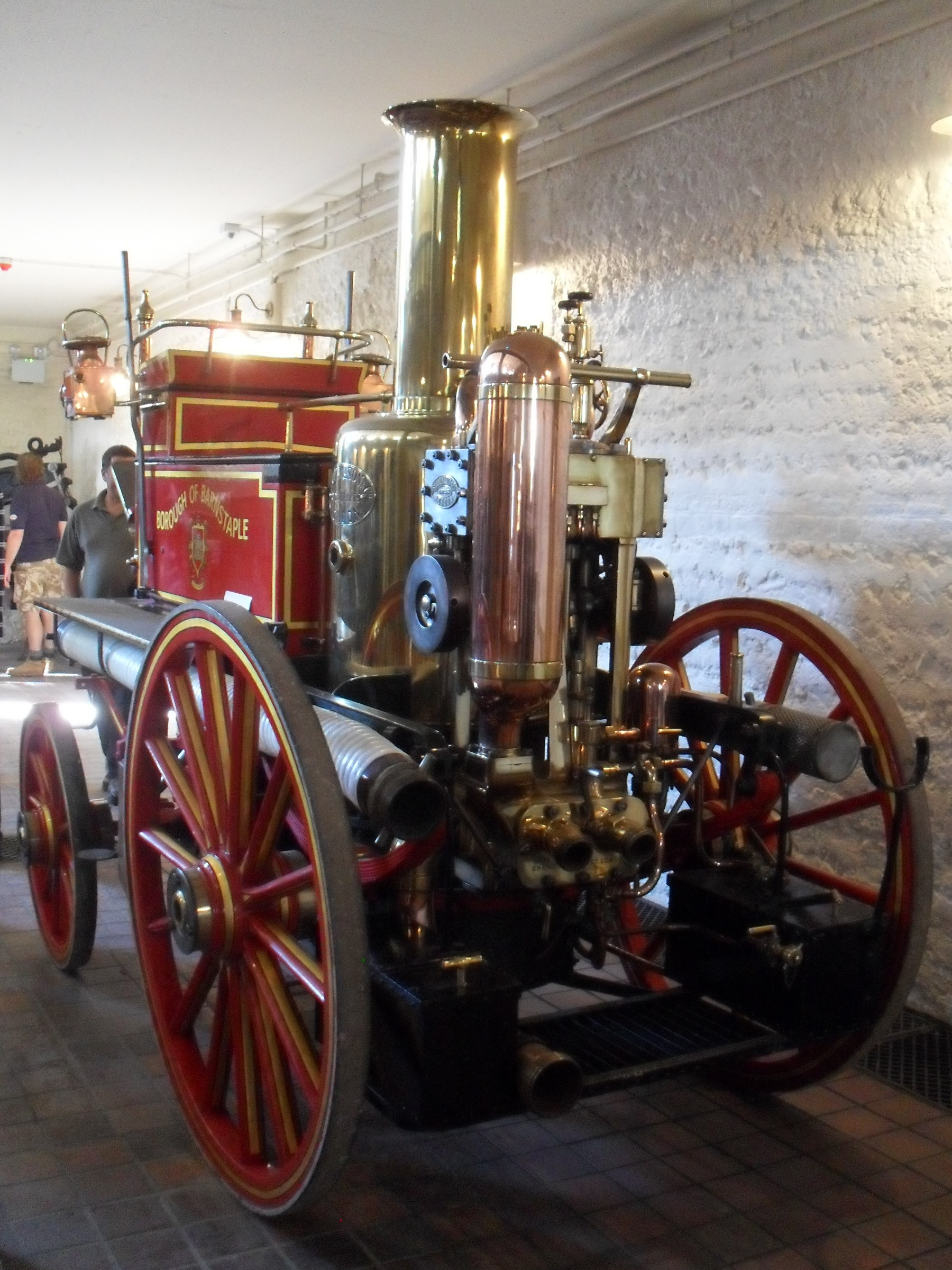
Exhibits include this 1890 steam-powered fire engine.

The Engineerium also has a horse-drawn fire engine dating from 1890. Originally owned by the local authority in Barnstaple, Devon, the Shand Mason & Company vehicle was bought and restored by the museum's employees. It is a vertical steam engine with two cylinders and a pair of pistons flanking a central crank. A steam traction engine built in 1886 by Marshall, Sons & Company has also been restored. A range of veteran motorcycles are on display; the oldest is an Ariel Motorcycles vehicle built in 1915.

Elsewhere in the complex, smaller steam engines are on display, alongside Victorian tools and domestic equipment such as stoves. Much of the equipment in the workshop is also original, such as the main forge and a heavy-duty metal lathe. The single-cylinder Easton and Amos steam engine used to power the belts which drive the machine tools in the workshop was already several years old when the Goldstone Pumping Station acquired it in 1875.

From the beginning, the overriding purpose of the collection of exhibits was to portray and explain the history and development of civil and mechanical engineering and British industry, through both the restoration of the pumping station's original equipment and the acquisition of other pieces associated with industrial pioneers such as James Watt, Michael Faraday and George Stephenson. An example is a model of Stephenson's Locomotion No 1 engine, which was valued at £75,000 by Bonhams when the Engineerium was up for auction in 2006.

== Heritage status ==
When Jonathan Minns, who later bought the complex, found in 1971 that it was threatened with demolition, he successfully sought to get it listed by the Historic Buildings Council for England (the predecessor of English Heritage). The organisation granted listed status in five separate parts on 7 June 1971, covering the pumping station's five main structures. The boiler rooms and engine house were jointly listed at Grade II*, as was its free-standing chimney. Three more structures were listed at Grade II: the cooling pond and leat, the coal storage shed and the flint and brick walls surrounding the complex. Grade II* is the second highest of the three designations awarded to listed buildings; such buildings are defined as being "particularly important ... [and] of more than special interest". As of February 2001, the boiler house and chimney represented two of the 70 Grade II*-listed buildings and structures, and 1,218 listed buildings of all grades, in the city of Brighton and Hove. Grade II is the lowest status, given to "nationally important buildings of special interest". In February 2001, there were 1,124 such buildings in the city.

In 1982, an 8.89-acre (3.60 ha) zone incorporating the whole Engineerium complex became a conservation area—one of 34 such areas in the city of Brighton and Hove.

== See also ==
- Brede Waterworks
- British Engineering Excellence Awards
- Grade II* listed buildings in Brighton and Hove
- Grade II listed buildings in Brighton and Hove: A–B
- List of conservation areas in Brighton and Hove
