= Henry Royce Institute =

UK national institute for materials research

- The Sir Henry Royce Institute for Advanced Materials Research and Innovation
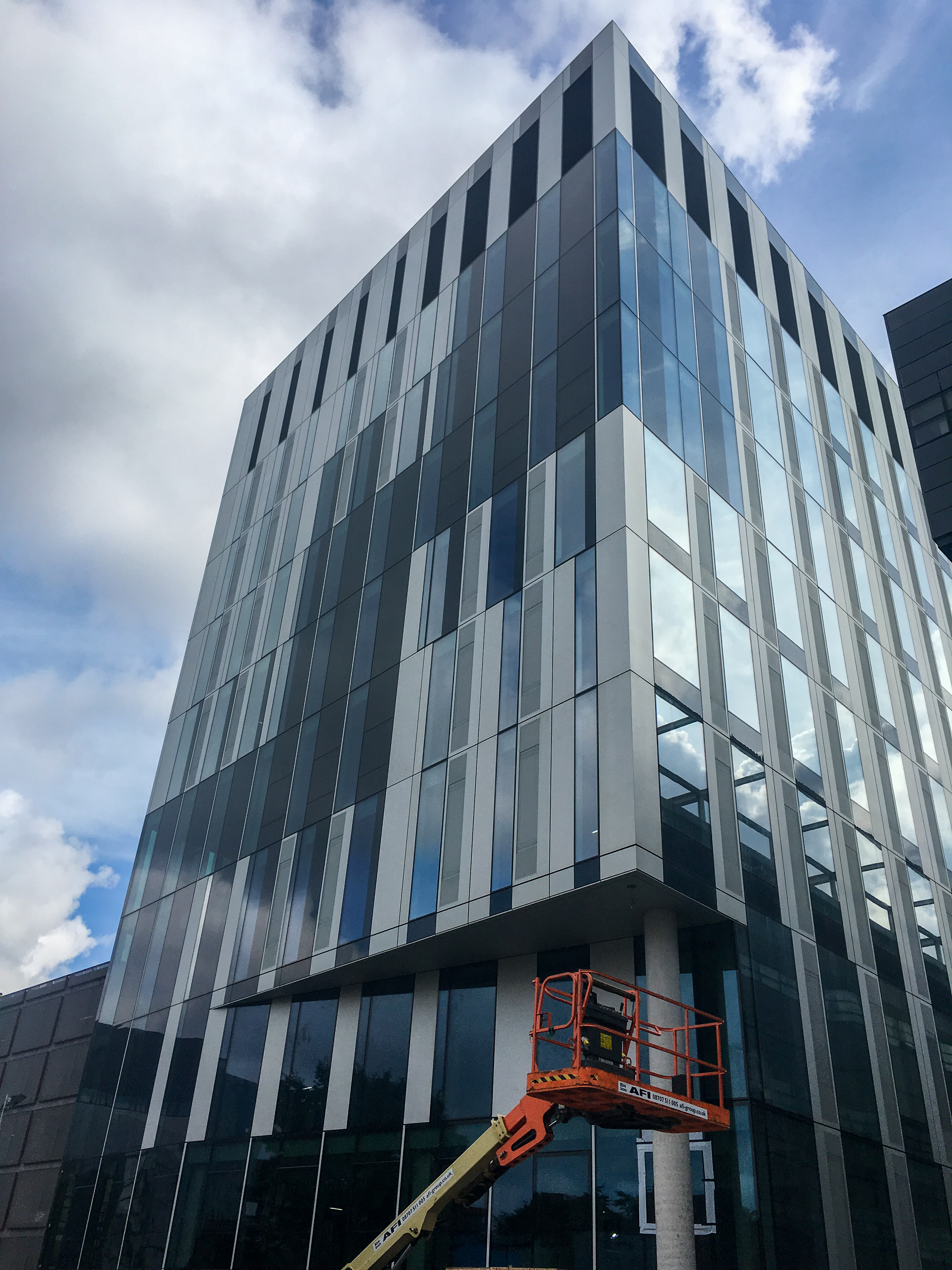
- The building under construction in 2019
- Named after: Sir Frederick Henry Royce
- Formation: 2015
- Founded at: University of Manchester
- Purpose: Research and Innovation
- Headquarters: Royce Hub Building, Oxford Rd, Manchester M13 9PL
- Location: Manchester, United Kingdom
- Members: Imperial College London; National Nuclear Laboratory; UK Atomic Energy Authority; University of Cambridge; University of Leeds; University of Liverpool; University of Manchester; University of Oxford; University of Sheffield; Cranfield University; University of Strathclyde
- CEO: Dave Knowles
- Chair: Mark E. Smith
- Chief Scientist: Philip Withers
- Parent organization: Engineering and Physical Sciences Research Council (EPSRC)
- Website: www.royce.ac.uk
- Building details

General information
- Coordinates: 53°28′06″N 2°13′55″W
- Construction started: 2017
- Estimated completion: 2020
- Cost: £105 million

Height
- Height: 46 metres (151 ft)

Technical details
- Floor area: 16,000 square metres (170,000 sq ft)

The Henry Royce Institute (often referred to as ‘Royce’) is the UK’s national institute for advanced materials research and innovation.

== Vision ==
Royce's vision is to identify challenges and stimulate innovation in advanced materials research to support sustainable growth and development. Royce aims to be a "single front door" to the UK’s materials research community. Its stated mission is to “support world-recognised excellence in UK materials research, accelerating commercial exploitation of innovations, and delivering positive economic and societal impact for the UK.”

Operating from its Hub at the University of Manchester, Royce is a partnership of eleven leading UK institutions. Royce operates as a hub and spoke collaboration between the University of Manchester (the hub), and the spokes of the founding Partners National Nuclear Laboratory, UK Atomic Energy Authority, Imperial College London, University of Cambridge, University of Leeds, University of Liverpool, University of Oxford and the University of Sheffield. Royce also has two Associate Partners, Cranfield University and the University of Strathclyde.

== Aims ==
Royce aims to fulfil its mission by:

- Enabling national materials research foresighting, collaboration and strategy
- Providing access to the latest equipment facilities and capabilities
- Catalysing industrial collaboration and exploitation of materials research
- Fostering materials science skills development, innovation training, and outreach.

== History ==
In 2014, Chancellor George Osborne announced the launch of the Henry Royce Institute for advanced materials science in his Autumn Statement in 2014. He pledged "a quarter of a billion" to support his proposals from June 2014 on creating a Northern Powerhouse. Royce was then established through a grant from the Engineering and Physical Sciences Research Council (EPSRC), which has been used to fund construction and refurbishment of buildings, equipment, and research and technical staff. Royce now coordinates over 900 academics and over £300 million in facilities, "providing a joined-up framework that can deliver beyond the current capabilities of individual partners or research teams.”

Royce is one of the EPSRC's four major research institutes, the other three being: The Alan Turing Institute in data science; The Faraday Institution in battery science and technology; and the Rosalind Franklin Institute, which focuses on transforming life science through interdisciplinary research and technology development. These institutes represent a total financial investment of around £478 million and reflect the EPSRC’s vision and objectives ("to deliver economic impact and social prosperity; to realise the potential of engineering and physical sciences research; and to enable the UK engineering and physical sciences landscape to deliver").

In 2022, the Secretary of State for Business, Energy and Industrial Strategy, Grant Schapps announced a further £95 Million investment into Royce to deliver Phase 2 of its operations.

== Name ==
The Henry Royce Institute is named after Sir Frederick Henry Royce OBE, a British engineer famous for his designs of car and airplane engines. Henry Royce manufactured his first car in Manchester in 1904, and in 1906 co-founded Rolls-Royce.

== Research strategy ==
Royce strategy currently focuses on research in five areas:

1. Low carbon power: new modes of energy generation, energy storage, and efficient energy use – from hydrogen to fusion power and energy-efficient devices
2. Infrastructure and mobility: efficient housing, clean transport, and transforming foundation industries for clean manufacturing
3. Digital and Communications: low-loss digital processes quantum technologies for computing, sensors, and data storage
4. Circular economy: rethinking the way we use plastic and engage with waste streams, developing truly degradable materials
5. Health and wellbeing: reducing carbon emissions and enabling clean water production, delivering personalised medicine, and supporting the ageing population.

In September 2020, Royce published five technology roadmaps to "set out how materials science can be harnessed to deliver net-zero targets". These roadmaps were the product of a collaboration with the Institute of Physics and the Institute for Manufacturing, convening the UK's academic and industrial materials research communities to explore how novel materials and processes can contribute to more sustainable, affordable, and reliable energy production. The roadmaps cover photovoltaics, hydrogen, thermoelectrics, calorics, and low-loss electronics.

== Structure ==
Royce operates as a hub-and-spoke model, with the hub at the University of Manchester and spokes at the other founding Partners, comprising the universities of Sheffield, Leeds, Liverpool, Cambridge, Oxford and Imperial College London, as well as UKAEA and NNL. The hub and spokes collaborate on research in the following areas:

- 2-Dimensional materials – led by the University of Manchester
- Advanced metals processing – led by the University of Sheffield and the University of Manchester
- Atoms to devices – led jointly by the University of Leeds, Imperial College London, the University of Cambridge and the University of Manchester
- Biomedical materials – led by the University of Manchester
- Chemical materials design – led by the University of Liverpool and the University of Manchester
- Electrochemical Systems – led by the University of Oxford
- Materials systems for demanding environments – led by the University of Manchester and Cranfield University
- Nuclear materials – led by the University of Manchester, National Nuclear Laboratory and UKAEA

== Location ==
The Henry Royce Institute’s hub in Manchester is in line with the Northern Powerhouse policy, and the UK government’s aim to support centres of excellence outside of the "Golden Triangle" of research institutions in London, Cambridge and Oxford.

New buildings funded or part-funded by the Royce grant include:

=== Royce Hub Building, Manchester ===
The newly-constructed £105m Royce Hub Building draws together research facilities and meeting spaces to drive collaboration and industry engagement. Research undertaken here encompasses biomedical, metals processing, digital fabrication, and sustainable materials themes.

The nine-storey Hub building in the heart of the University of Manchester campus is 46 metres (151 ft) high, making it the second-tallest current building on the campus after the Maths and Social Sciences Building. It has 16,000 square metres (170,000 sq ft) of space. It is located next to the Alan Turing Building, and is close to the National Graphene Institute, the School of Physics and Astronomy, the School of Chemistry, and the Manchester Engineering Campus Development.

The building was due to open in autumn 2020, but the ceremony was delayed due to the COVID-19 pandemic. Planning permission was granted in February 2017 and construction started in December 2017. It was originally going to be constructed on the site of the BBC's New Broadcasting House, but the site was changed to the main campus of the university.

=== Sir Michael Uren Hub, Imperial ===
Royce funding was invested in Imperial’s new Sir Michael Uren Hub building, on which Royce occupies the eighth floor. Final works are still ongoing on some floors of the building, which has not yet been officially opened. Royce facilities here focus on the production and characterisation of thin films and devices composed of a broad spectrum of materials.

=== Bragg Centre for Materials Research, Leeds ===
Housed within the new Sir William Henry Bragg Building, the Bragg Centre for Materials Research will become operational in 2021, with a formal opening following in 2022. Royce equipment at the Bragg Centre focusses on enabling the discovery, creation, characterisation, and exploitation of materials engineered at the atomic level.

=== Royce Discovery Centre, Sheffield ===
Located in the new Harry Brearley Building in the centre of Sheffield, construction on the Royce Discovery Centre finished in 2020 with a formal opening in 2022. Housing equipment worth over £20m, the building features specialist laboratories, workshops and office spaces focussed on early-stage materials discovery and processing.

=== Materials Innovation Factory, Liverpool ===
Royce invested £10.9m in Liverpool’s new Materials Innovation Factory – an £81m facility dedicated to the research and development of advanced materials. Officially opened in 2018, the site includes a Royce Open Access Area which houses one of the highest concentrations of materials science robotics in the world, and also a suite of advanced analytical equipment.

=== Royce Translational Centre, Sheffield ===
Part of the University of Sheffield’s Advanced Manufacturing Park, the Royce Translational Centre officially opened in October 2018 Its purpose is to evolve novel materials and processing techniques developed by research teams, making them accessible for trial by industry collaborators.

=== Royce@Cambridge ===
Royce@Cambridge is based within Cambridge’s contemporary Maxwell Centre with labs at various sites on the University's West Cambridge site. Royce’s £10m investment in open access facilities at the University of Cambridge address energy generation, energy storage, and efficient energy use, with equipment for fabrication of new battery structures, X-ray photoelectron spectroscopy, X-ray tomography, and electrochemical characterisation.

== Outreach ==
Alongside funding research and facilities, Royce has funded outreach and skills programmes aimed at encouraging children and young people to consider careers in Materials Science and Engineering. Working with the Discover Materials group, they facilitated a virtual open week in July/August 2020 aimed at 16-18 year olds considering university degrees. Royce also has a regular stand at the annual Bluedot festival, engaging children and their families in interactive materials science challenges.

== Collaborations ==
Royce partners have collaborated with other institutions to win grants from the Faraday Institution to develop new energy storage technologies. Royce has also collaborated with the Alan Turing Institute on some data-centric engineering challenges, and the Franklin Institute on procuring characterisation capabilities.

== Leadership ==
The Royce leadership team comprises:

- Chair: Professor Mark Smith
- CEO: Professor David Knowles FREng
- Chief Scientist: Professor Phil Withers FRS, FREng
- Chief Scientist Officer: Professor Ian Kinloch

== Connection to UK Government Policy ==
Advanced materials innovation is a key focus area for the UK for several reasons. UK businesses that depend on the production/processing of materials represent 15% of UK GDP, have a turnover of approximately £200bn, exports of £50bn and employ over 2.6 million people. Research in advanced materials is an area of national strength as one of the "Eight Great" technologies, and is a major contributor to most of the other seven, with over 150,000 published patent applications between 2004–2013. Of the UK’s sector strategies, advanced materials is the critical component to ensure the full economic benefit for the energy sector, transportation, construction, a growing digital economy, life sciences, and agriculture technology.
