= Fullerian Professor of Chemistry =

Academic position at the Royal Institution

The Fullerian Chairs at the Royal Institution in London, England, were established by John 'Mad Jack' Fuller.

== Fullerian Professors of Chemistry ==
- 1833 Michael Faraday
- 1868 William Odling
- 1874 John Hall Gladstone
- 1877 James Dewar
- 1923 William Henry Bragg
- 1942 Henry H. Dale
- 1946 Eric Keightley Rideal
- 1950 Edward Neville da Costa Andrade
- 1953 William Lawrence Bragg
- 1966 George Porter
- 1988 John Meurig Thomas
- 1994 Peter Day
- 2008 Quentin Pankhurst

== Bibliography ==
- "Fullerian Professors of Chemistry". The Royal Institution of Great Britain. 2012. Archived from the original on 10 June 2012.
