= Director of the Royal Institution =

Below are directors of the Royal Institution of Great Britain, with date of appointment.

Director of the Laboratory

- 1801 Humphry Davy
- 1825 Michael Faraday
- 1867 John Tyndall
- 1887 James Dewar

Director of the Davy-Faraday Research Laboratory

- 1896 James Dewar
- 1896 Lord Rayleigh
- 1923 William Bragg
- 1942 Henry Hallett Dale
- 1946 Eric Rideal
- 1950 Edward Andrade
- 1954 Lawrence Bragg
- 1998 Richard Catlow
- 2008 Quentin Pankhurst

Director

- 1965 William Lawrence Bragg
- 1966 George, Baron Porter of Luddenham
- 1986 David Philips (acting)
- 1986 John Meurig Thomas
- 1991 Peter Day
- 1998 Susan Greenfield, Baroness Greenfield
- 2017 Sarah Harper
- 2018 Shaun Fitzgerald
- 2022 Katherine Mathieson
