= Cardew =

Cardew may refer to:

People with the given name Cardew:

- Alfred Cardew Dixon (1865–1936), English mathematician
- Cardew Robinson (1917–1992), British comic

People with the surname Cardew:

- Cornelius Cardew (1936–1981), English avant-garde composer
- Gail Cardew, British science communicator
- Michael Cardew (1901–1983), English studio potter and ceramic stylist
- Philip Cardew (1851–1910), English army officer and electrical engineer
- Seth Cardew (1934–2016), English studio potter

Places:

- Cardew, Cumbria
