= George Porter =

British chemist (1920–2002)

The Right Honourable The Lord Porter of Luddenham OM FRS FRSE
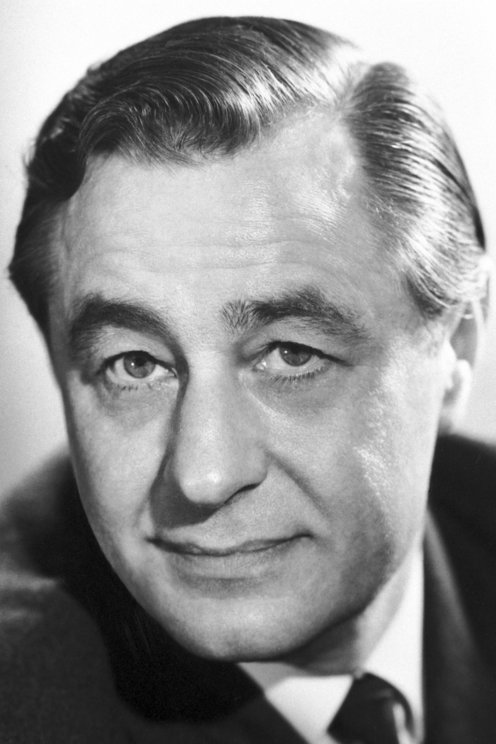
- Born: George Porter; 6 December 1920; Stainforth, England
- Died: 31 August 2002 (aged 81)
- Education: University of Leeds (BSc); Emmanuel College, Cambridge; (PhD)
- Known for: Flash photolysis
- Spouse: Stella Jean Brooke (since 1949)
- Awards: Corday-Morgan Prize (1955); FRS (1960); Nobel Prize in Chemistry (1967); Davy Medal (1971); Kalinga Prize (1976); Rumford Medal (1978); Faraday Lectureship Prize (1980); Order of Merit (1989); Michael Faraday Prize (1991); Copley Medal (1992)
- Scientific career
- Fields: Chemistry
- Workplaces: University of Sheffield; University College London; University of Leicester; Royal Institution
- Thesis: The study of free radicals produced by photochemical means (1949)
- Doctoral advisor: Ronald Norrish
- Doctoral students: James Robert Durrant; Graham Fleming

Member of the House of Lords
- Lord Temporal
- Life peerage 16 July 1990 – 31 August 2002

George Porter, Baron Porter of Luddenham, OM, FRS, FRSE (6 December 1920 – 31 August 2002) was a British chemist known for his work on flash photolysis who was Chancellor of the University of Leicester and President of the Royal Society. He was awarded the Nobel Prize in Chemistry in 1967.

== Education and early life ==
Porter was born in Stainforth, near Thorne, in the then West Riding of Yorkshire. He was educated at Thorne Grammar School, then won a scholarship to the University of Leeds and gained his first degree in chemistry. During his degree, Porter was taught by Meredith Gwynne Evans, who he said was the most brilliant chemist he had ever met. He was awarded a PhD from the University of Cambridge in 1949 for research investigating free radicals produced by photochemical means. He later became a Fellow of Emmanuel College, Cambridge.

== Career and research ==
During the Second World War Porter served in the Royal Naval Volunteer Reserve. He then went on to do research supervised by Ronald George Wreyford Norrish at the University of Cambridge, where he began the work that ultimately led to them becoming Nobel laureates.

His original research in developing the technique of flash photolysis to obtain information on short-lived molecular species provided the first evidence of free radicals. His later research utilised the technique to study the detailed aspects of the light-dependent reactions of photosynthesis, with particular regard to possible applications to a hydrogen economy, of which he was a strong advocate.

From 1953 to 1954 he served as Assistant Director of the British Rayon Research Association, where he studied the phototendering of dyed cellulose fabrics in sunlight.

Porter served as professor in the Chemistry department at the University of Sheffield from 1954 to 1965. Here he started his work on flash photolysis with equipment designed and made in the departmental workshop. During this tenure he took part in a television programme describing his work in the "Eye on Research" series. Porter became Fullerian Professor of Chemistry at the Royal Institution in London and Director of the Royal Institution in 1966. During his directorship of the Royal Institution, Porter was instrumental in the setting up of Applied Photophysics, a company formed to supply instrumentation based on his group's work. He was awarded the Nobel Prize in Chemistry in 1967 along with Manfred Eigen and Ronald George Wreyford Norrish. In the same year he became a visiting professor at University College London.

Porter was a major contributor to the public understanding of science, and championed the cause of "not-yet-applied science". He became president of the British Association in 1985 and was the founding Chair of the Committee on the Public Understanding of Science (COPUS). He gave the Romanes Lecture, entitled "Science and the human purpose", at the University of Oxford in 1978; and in 1988 he gave the Dimbleby Lecture, "Knowledge itself is power". From 1990 to 1993 he gave the Gresham lectures in astronomy.

=== Awards and honours ===
Porter was elected a Fellow of the Royal Society (FRS) in 1960, a member of the American Academy of Arts and Sciences in 1979, a member of the American Philosophical Society in 1986, and served as President of the Royal Society from 1985 to 1990. He was also awarded the Davy Medal in 1971, the Rumford Medal in 1978, the Ellison-Cliffe Medal in 1991 and the Copley Medal in 1992.

Porter received an Honorary Doctorate from Heriot-Watt University in 1971.

He was knighted in 1972, appointed to the Order of Merit in 1989, and became a life peer as Baron Porter of Luddenham, of Luddenham in the County of Kent, in 1990. In 1995, he was awarded an Honorary Degree (Doctor of Laws) from the University of Bath.

In 1976 he gave the Royal Institution Christmas Lecture on The Natural History of a Sunbeam.

Porter served as Chancellor of the University of Leicester between 1984 and 1995. In 2001, the university named its chemistry building the George Porter Building in his honour.

== Family ==
In 1949 Porter married Stella Jean Brooke.

== Publications ==
- Chemistry for the Modern World (1962)
- Chemistry in Microtime (1996)

== See also ==
- List of presidents of the Royal Society

Cultural offices
Preceded by William Lawrence Bragg	Director of the Royal Institution; 1966–1986	Succeeded by John Meurig Thomas
Academic offices
Preceded by Sir Alan Hodgkin	3rd Chancellor of the University of Leicester; 1984–1995	Succeeded by Sir Michael Atiyah
Professional and academic associations
Preceded by Andrew Huxley	56th President of the Royal Society; 1985–1990	Succeeded by Sir Michael Atiyah
