= Peter Day (chemist) =

British inorganic chemist (1938–2020)

- Born: 20 August 1938; Wrotham, Kent, England
- Died: 19 May 2020 (aged 81); Marsh Baldon, Oxfordshire, England
- Education: University of Oxford (BA, DPhil)
- Awards: FRS (1986); FRSC; FInstP
- Scientific career
- Workplaces: University College London
- Thesis: Light induced charge transfer in solids (1965)
- Doctoral advisor: RJP Williams
- Doctoral students: Matthew Rosseinsky

Peter Day, FRS, FRSC, FInstP (20 August 1938 – 19 May 2020) was a British inorganic chemist and Professor of Chemistry at Oxford University and later at University College London (UCL).

== Early life and education ==
Day was born 20 August 1938 in Wrotham, Kent. He was educated at Maidstone Grammar School and Wadham College, Oxford where he was awarded a Bachelor of Arts degree in 1961 and a Doctor of Philosophy degree in 1965 for research supervised by Robert Williams.

== Career and research ==
Day was a contributor to the field of materials chemistry, seeking unusual physical properties in inorganic and metal–organic compounds and models to explain them. He played a key role in the development of mixed-valence chemistry, and has carried out important experimental and theoretical work on the spectra, magnetic properties and conductivity of solid, inorganic complexes.

As a young researcher, he gave the first theoretically consistent description of the visible–ultraviolet spectra of vitamin B12 and its derivatives. Later, he put the assignment of inorganic charge-transfer spectra on a more rigorous basis; he correlated structures and physical properties of metal chain compounds and identified the first optically transparent ferromagnetic compounds by combined optical and neutron scattering methods. He also measured and systematised the optical properties of metamagnets.

Peter Day's graduate work initiated the study of mixed-valence compounds and led to the Robin-Day Classification of such species.

In 2012, he published a memoir about his life in science.

== Personal life ==
Day was married to Frances, who died in 2018, and had two children, Alison and Christopher, and five grandchildren. Day died on 19 May 2020, at his home in Marsh Baldon, Oxfordshire, at the age of 81.

== Awards and honours ==
Day received awards from both the Royal Society (including the Bakerian Lecture in 1999) and the Royal Society of Chemistry; the latter named one of its awards in materials chemistry after him. He served many national and international agencies and institutions, both professional and governmental, and held numerous honorary degrees and fellowships.

Day was elected a Fellow of the Royal Society (FRS) in 1986, and held the post of Director of the Royal Institution from 1991 to 1998. Day was also director of the Royal Institution's Davy-Faraday Research Laboratory and the Fullerian Professor of Chemistry.

Day was made an honorary fellow of Wadham College, Oxford in 2003 and was a Fellow of the Institute of Physics.

Cultural offices
Preceded by John Meurig Thomas	Director of the Royal Institution; 1991–1998	Succeeded by Susan Greenfield
