= Ronald George Wreyford Norrish =

British chemist (1897–1978)

Ronald George Wreyford Norrish FRS
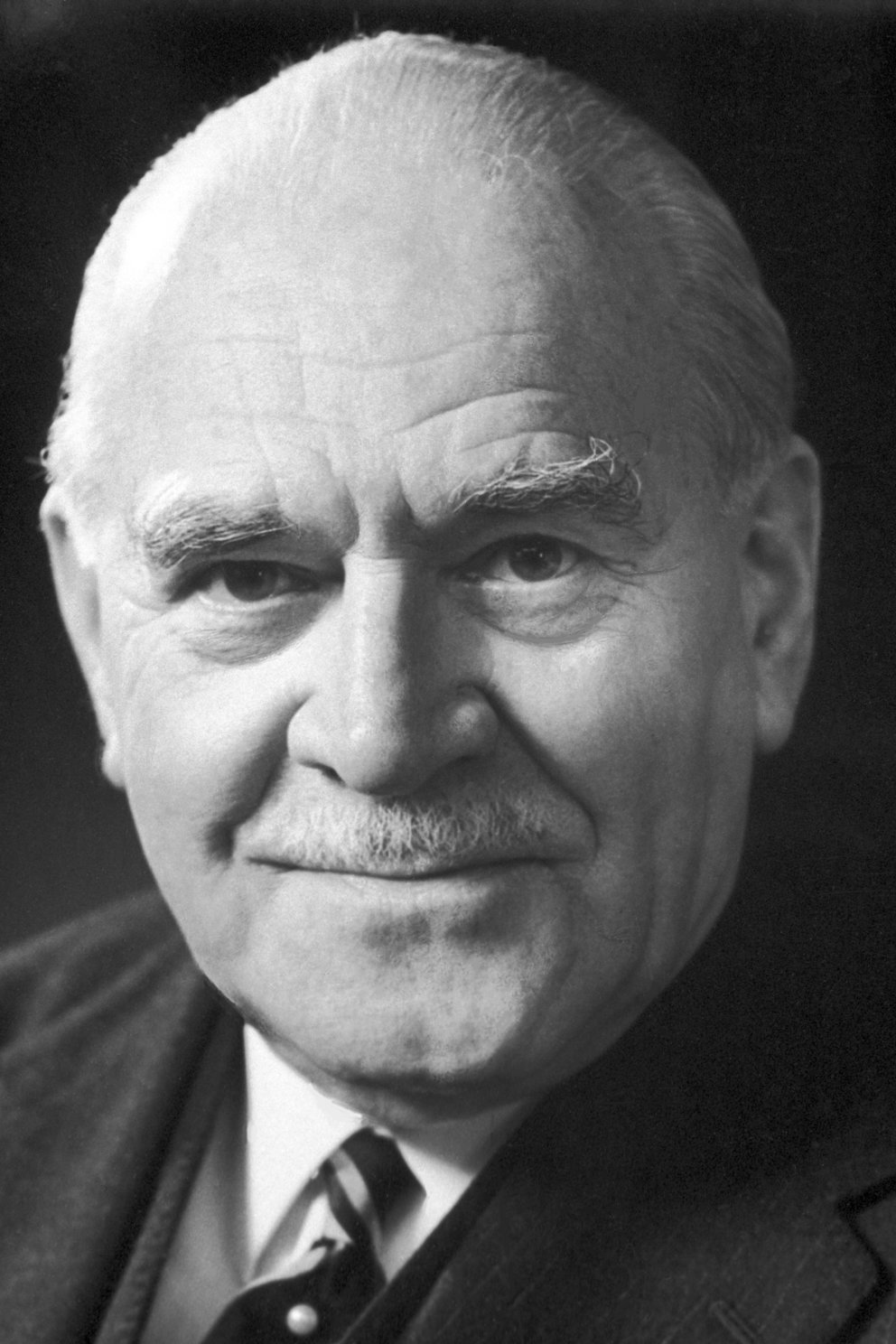
- Born: 9 November 1897; Cambridge, England
- Died: 7 June 1978 (aged 80); Cambridge, England
- Education: University of Cambridge (BA, PhD)
- Known for: Flash photolysis Norrish reaction Trommsdorff–Norrish effect
- Awards: Davy Medal (1958); Faraday Lectureship Prize (1965); Nobel Prize in Chemistry (1967)
- Scientific career
- Fields: Chemistry
- Workplaces: University of Cambridge
- Thesis: Radiation and chemical reactivity (1924)
- Doctoral advisor: Eric Rideal

Ronald George Wreyford Norrish FRS (9 November 1897 – 7 June 1978) was a British chemist who was awarded the Nobel Prize in Chemistry in 1967.

== Education and early life ==
Norrish was born in Cambridge and was educated at The Perse School and Emmanuel College, Cambridge. He was a former student of Eric Rideal. From an early age he was interested in chemistry, walking up and down Cambridge University chemical laboratory admiring all the equipment. His father encouraged him to construct and equip a small laboratory in his garden shed in his garden and supplied all the chemicals he needed to conduct experiments. This apparatus now forms part of the Science Museum collections – reference shows copper water tank. He used to enter competitions for the analysis of mixtures sent round by the Pharmaceutical Journal and often won prizes. In 1915 Norrish won a Foundation Scholarship to Emmanuel College, but by adding a little to his age joined the Royal Field Artillery and served as a Lieutenant, first in Ireland and then on the Western Front.

== Career and research ==
Norrish was a prisoner in World War I and later commented, with sadness, that many of his contemporaries and potential competitors at Cambridge had not survived the War. Military records show that 2nd Lieutenant Norrish of the Royal Artillery went missing (captured) on 21 March 1918.

Norrish rejoined Emmanuel College as a Research Fellow in 1925 and later became Head of the Department of Physical Chemistry at the University of Cambridge.

The skill which Norrish displayed in his laboratory work problems marked him out amongst his contemporaries as an unusually gifted and energetic experimentalist, capable of making significant advances in photo-chemistry and gas kinetics.

== Awards and honours ==
Norrish was elected a Fellow of the Royal Society (FRS) in 1936. As a result of the development of flash photolysis, Norrish was awarded the Nobel Prize in Chemistry in 1967 along with Manfred Eigen and George Porter for their study of extremely fast chemical reactions. One of his accomplishments is the development of the Norrish reaction.

At Cambridge, Norrish supervised Rosalind Franklin, future DNA researcher and colleague of James Watson and Francis Crick, and experienced some conflict with her.
