= John Meurig Thomas =

Welsh scientist and educator (1932–2020)

Sir John Meurig Thomas FRS FLSW HonFREng HonFRSE FRMS
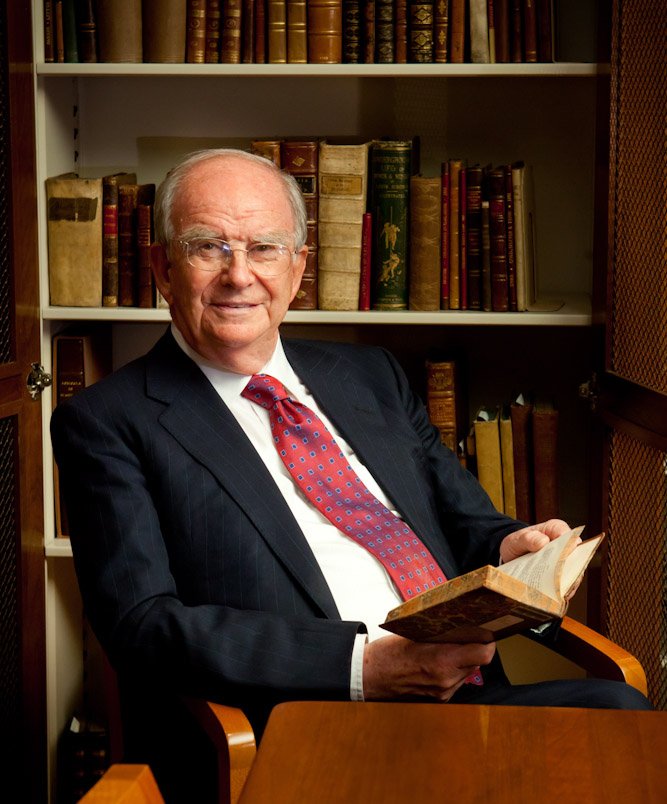
- Thomas in 2011
- Born: 15 December 1932; Gwendraeth Valley, Carmarthenshire, Wales
- Died: 13 November 2020 (aged 87)
- Education: University College of Swansea (BSc); Queen Mary College, London (PhD)
- Awards: FRS (1977); Davy Medal; Faraday Lectureship Award (1989); Willard Gibbs Award (1995); Bakerian Lecture (1990); Knight Bachelor (1991); Linus Pauling Gold Medal (2003); Giulio Natta Gold Medal (2004); Kapitza Gold Medal (2011); Royal Medal (2016)
- Scientific career
- Workplaces: Royal Institution; University of Cambridge
- Thesis: The significance of structure in carbon-gas reactions (1957)
- Doctoral advisor: Keble Sykes
- Website: www.ch.cam.ac.uk/person/jmt2

External videos
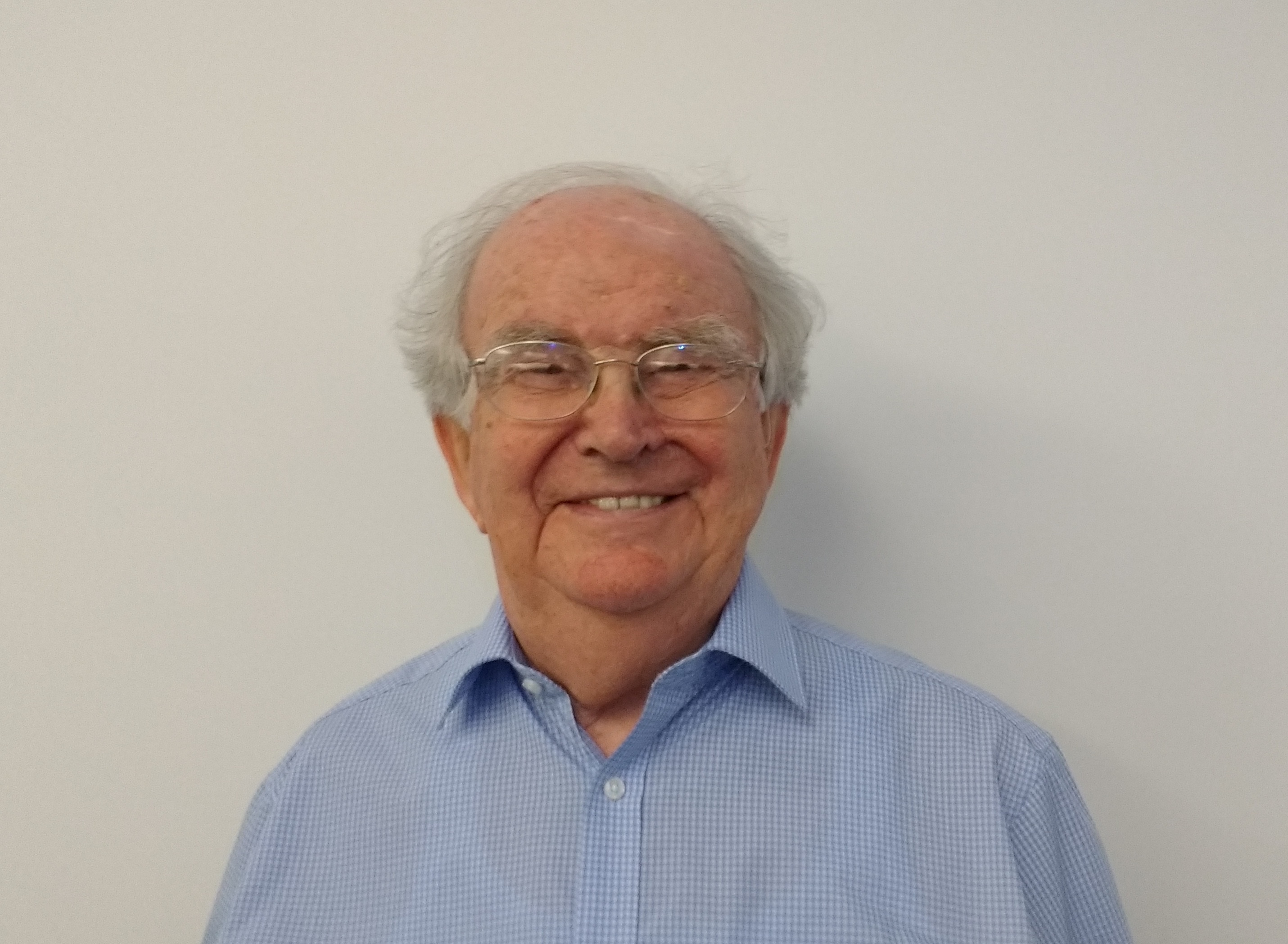
- "Can Selective Catalysts Deliver Clean Technology and Sustainability?", Sir John Meurig Thomas, 19 June 2012
- "Some of Tomorrow's Catalysts: Actual and Desired", Sir John Meurig Thomas, 27 May 2015
- "Sir John Meurig Thomas discusses Humphry Davy's development of the miner's safety lamp", The Royal Society, 31 March 2015

Sir John Meurig Thomas (15 December 1932 – 13 November 2020), also known as JMT, was a Welsh scientist, educator, university administrator, and historian of science primarily known for his work on heterogeneous catalysis, solid-state chemistry, and surface and materials science.

He was one of the founders of solid-state chemistry, starting with his work at the University of Wales, Bangor, in 1958 when he investigated the various ways in which dislocations influence the chemical, electronic and excitonic properties of a range of solids. He was one of the first to exploit electron microscopy as a chemical tool, especially to deduce active-site reactivities from the surface topography of many minerals and crystal hydrates. At the University of Aberystwyth (1969–1978) he elucidated the surface chemistry of diamond, clay minerals, metals and intercalates by pioneering UV and X-ray photoelectron spectroscopy. He also initiated the field of crystal engineering of organic molecules. As head of physical chemistry department at the University of Cambridge (1978–1986), then a separate department to chemistry, he used magic-angle-spinning NMR and high-resolution electron microscopy to characterize and determine the structures of zeolites and other nanoporous catalysts. As Fullerian Professor and Director of the Royal Institution and of the Davy–Faraday Research Laboratory, he utilized synchrotron radiation to characterize, in situ, new catalysts designed for green chemistry and clean technology.

He was the recipient of many national and international awards; and, for his contribution to geochemistry, the mineral meurigite was named in his honour. He was Master of Peterhouse, University of Cambridge (1993–2002), and was knighted in 1991 "for services to chemistry and the popularisation of science".

Thomas authored more than 1200 scientific articles and several books, including Michael Faraday and the Royal Institution: The Genius of Man and Place (1991), Principles and Practice of Heterogeneous Catalysis (with W. John Thomas, 1997, 2014), and Design and Applications of Single-Site Heterogeneous Catalysts: Contributions to Green Chemistry, Clean Technology and Sustainability (2012).

== Biography ==
=== Early life and education ===
Thomas was born and brought up in the Gwendraeth Valley, Carmarthenshire, Wales, near the mining town of Llanelli, where his father and brother were miners. He attended Gwendraeth Grammar School.

Thomas earned a BSc degree from the University College of Wales, Swansea (later Swansea University) in 1954. He earned a PhD from Queen Mary College (later Queen Mary University of London) in 1958, working with Keble W. Sykes.

=== Personal life ===
In 1959, Thomas married Margaret Edwards with whom he had two daughters. Margaret Thomas died in 2002.

In April 2010, Thomas married Jehane Ragai of the American University in Cairo; the events took place in Cambridge and London.

The recreations he lists in Who's Who include ancient civilisations, bird watching, and Welsh literature.

=== Early career ===
After a year's work for the United Kingdom Atomic Energy Authority as scientific officer (1957–1958), Thomas joined the Department of Chemistry at the University College of North Wales (later Bangor University) as of September 1958. There he rose through the ranks from Assistant Lecturer (1958), to Lecturer (1959), to Senior Lecturer (1964) and then to Reader in 1965. Thomas demonstrated the profound influence of dislocations and other structural imperfections upon the chemical, electronic, and surface properties of solids.

In 1969 Thomas became a Professor and Head of Chemistry at the University College of Wales, Aberystwyth, where he broadened his interests in solid-state, surface and materials chemistry and pioneered new techniques for the application of electron microscopy in chemistry. In 1977 he was elected a Fellow of the Royal Society.

In 1978, Thomas succeeded Jack Linnett as Head of the Department of Physical Chemistry at the University of Cambridge (then a separate department from the Department of Chemistry, which covered Organic, Inorganic and Theoretical Chemistry). He also became a Professorial Fellow at King's College, Cambridge, holding both positions until 1986.

Thomas continued developing new techniques in solid-state and materials science, and designing and synthesising new catalysts. For example, he extended his earlier electron microscopic and surface studies of minerals and intercalates to encompass the synthesis and structural determination of zeolitic materials by a combination of solid-state NMR, neutron scattering, and real-space imaging.

=== Director of the Royal Institution ===
In 1986, Thomas succeeded Sir George Porter as Director of the Royal Institution of Great Britain, London. He also became the holder of the Michael Faraday chair, and the Director of the Davy Faraday Research Laboratory (DFRL). The Royal Institution was founded in 1799. Its earliest directors were Humphry Davy (1801–1825) and Michael Faraday (1825–1867). The Davy Faraday Research Laboratory opened on 22 December 1896, with funding from Ludwig Mond. It was "unique of its kind, being the only public laboratory in the world solely devoted to research in pure science".

At this time, Thomas began using synchrotron radiation and devised techniques which combine X-ray spectroscopy and high-resolution X-ray diffraction to determine the atomic structure of the active sites of solid catalysts under operating conditions. He also devised new mesoporous, microporous, and molecular sieve catalysts.

In 1987 the BBC televised Thomas' Royal Institution Christmas Lectures on crystals, continuing the tradition of lectures for children started by Faraday in 1825. In 1991 Thomas published the book Michael Faraday and the Royal Institution: The Genius of Man and Place, which has since been translated into Japanese (1994) and Italian (2007).

In 1991, Thomas resigned as Director of the Royal Institution and the Davy Faraday Research Laboratory, to be succeeded by Peter Day.

=== Return to Cambridge ===
After a period as Deputy Pro-Chancellor of the University of Wales (1991–1994), Thomas returned to Cambridge in 1993 as Master of Peterhouse, the oldest college of the university. He was the first scientist to hold the position.

In 1997 Thomas co-authored the text Principles and Practice of Heterogeneous Catalysis with W. John Thomas (no relation). In 1999 John Meurig Thomas was elected Honorary Fellow of the Royal Academy of Engineering for work that "has profoundly added to the science-base of heterogeneous catalysis leading to the commercial exploitation of zeolites through engineering processes".

Thomas was the author of some thirty patents, some of which have made chemical processes more environmentally benign ("greener") by eliminating the use of solvents and reducing the number of manufacturing steps involved. The single-step, solvent-free catalytic synthesis of ethyl acetate that he invented is the basis of a 200,000 ton/year plant in the UK, the largest of its kind in the world. He devised single-step, solvent-free processes for the production of caprolactam (the raw material for nylon-6) and vitamin B_{3} (niacin).

In 2002, Thomas stepped down from his position as Master of Peterhouse. He became Honorary Professor of Materials Science at the University of Cambridge and Emeritus Professor of Chemistry at the Davy Faraday Research Laboratory of the Royal Institution. He continued to be active in research at the Davy Faraday laboratory until 2006.

Thomas' death was reported on 13 November 2020, aged 87.

== Awards and honours ==
Thomas held an Honorary Distinguished Professorship of Materials Chemistry at Cardiff University. He was an Advisory Professor at Shanghai Jiao Tong University and at the Catalysis Center of Hokkaido University. He was an Honorary Bencher of Gray's Inn.

Thomas received twenty-three honorary degrees from Australian, British, Canadian, Chinese, Dutch, Egyptian, French, Italian, Japanese, Spanish, and U.S. universities, including an Honorary Degree of Doctor of Science from the University of St Andrews in 2012. He was elected to honorary membership of over fifteen foreign academies, including the Royal Swedish Academy of Sciences (2013), the American Philosophical Society (1992), the American Academy of Arts and Sciences (1990), the Accademia dei Lincei (Rome, 2012), and the Russian Academy of Sciences (1994). In 1993 he was elected an Honorary Fellow of the Royal Society of Edinburgh.

Other awards included the Kapitza Gold Medal from the Russian Academy of Natural Sciences (2011), the Jayne Prize Lectureship of the American Philosophical Society (2011), the Bragg Prize Lectureship of the British Crystallographic Association (2010), the Sven Berggren Prize Lectureship, Lund (2010), the Ertl Prize Lectureship of the Max Planck Gesellschaft (2010), the Sir George Stokes Medal from the Royal Society of Chemistry (2005), the Giulio Natta Gold Medal from the Società Chimica Italiana (2004), the Linus Pauling Gold Medal from Stanford University (2003), and the American Chemical Society Annual Award (first recipient) for Creative Research in Heterogeneous and Homogeneous Catalysis (1999). He won the Davy Medal of the Royal Society and the Faraday Lectureship Prize (1989) of the Royal Society of Chemistry. In 1995 he became the first British scientist in 80 years to be awarded the Willard Gibbs Award by the Chicago Section of the American Chemical Society. In 1967 he was a recipient of the Corday–Morgan Prize.

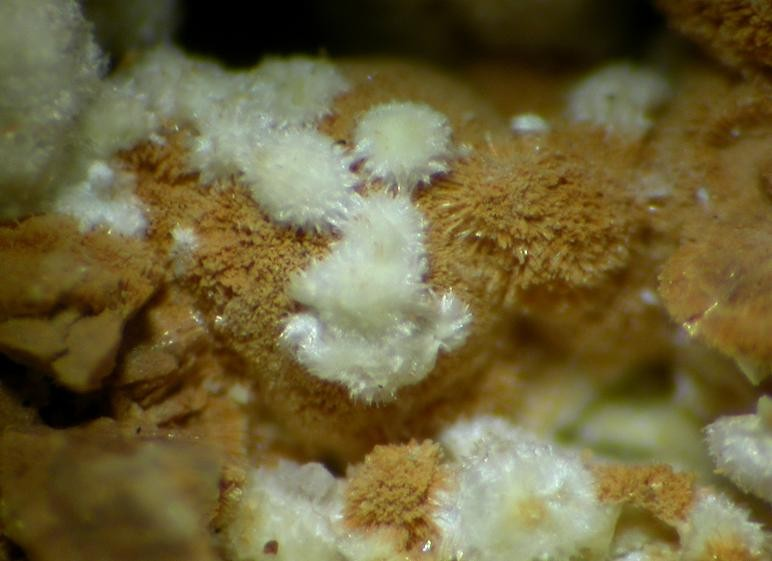
Yellowish-white hairy meurigite on brown ruifrancoite spheres

In recognition of his contributions to geochemistry, a new mineral, meurigite, was named after him in 1995 by the International Mineralogical Association. A hydrated potassium iron phosphate, meurigite is described as "tabular, elongated crystals forming spherical and hemispherical clusters and drusy coatings. The colour ranges from creamy white to pale yellow and yellowish brown." It is found in only a few locations worldwide, of which the designated type locality is the Santa Rita mine in New Mexico.

Thomas's 75th birthday was celebrated at the University of Cambridge with a symposium and several musical and social events. It was attended by Angela Merkel and Ahmed Zewail. The papers presented were published in 2008 by the Royal Society of Chemistry as Turning Points in Solid-State, Materials and Surface Science: A Book in Celebration of the Life and Work of Sir John Meurig Thomas.

In 2010 Imperial College Press published 4D Electron Microscopy: Imaging in Space and Time, which he co-authored with Ahmed Zewail (Nobel Laureate, Chemistry, 1999). His most recent publication is Design and Applications of Single-Site Heterogeneous Catalysts: Contributions to Green Chemistry, Clean Technology and Sustainability (2012)

In 2003, he was the first scientist to be awarded the Medal of the Honourable Society of Cymmrodorion (London) for services to Welsh culture and British public life. He was also a Founding Fellow of the Learned Society of Wales and a Member of its inaugural Council. From 2011 he was a member of the Scientific Advisory Committee for Wales. He was an overseer of the Science History Institute (Philadelphia), and a member of the International Advisory Board of the Zewail City of Science and Technology (Egypt).

Thomas was appointed as an Honorary Fellow of the Royal Academy of Engineering in 2013. In 2016, he was conferred an Honorary Fellowship by Beijing Normal University-Hong Kong Baptist University United International College (UIC), in view of his distinguished achievements in catalysis and materials science, and his dedication and outstanding contributions to the popularisation of science.

In October 2016, the Royal Society awarded Thomas the Royal Medal for Physical Sciences "for his pioneering work within catalytic chemistry, in particular on single-site heterogeneous catalysts, which have had a major impact on green chemistry, clean technology and sustainability." Prince Andrew, Duke of York represented queen Elizabeth II at the ceremony.

Also in 2016, the UK Catalysis Hub launched a new medal that "honours the achievements of Sir John Meurig Thomas, a distinguished professor in the field of catalysis." The JMT Medal will be awarded every year, to a person working in the United Kingdom, for outstanding achievement in catalysis or a closely related field.

== Selected scientific publications ==
=== Books ===
- Thomas, John Meurig; Thomas, W. John (1967). Introduction to the Principles of Heterogeneous Catalysis. New York: Academic Press.
- Thomas, John M.; Phillips, Sir David, eds. (1990). Selections and reflections: the legacy of Sir Lawrence Bragg. Northwood, Middlesex: Science Reviews Ltd.
- Thomas, J. M. (1991). Michael Faraday and the Royal Institution : the genius of man and place. New York; Milton Park, Abington: Taylor & Francis Group (Japanese translation 1994, Italian translation 2007, Chinese translation 2014). ISBN 978-0-7503-0145-9.
- Thomas, J. M.; Zamaraev, K. I.; International Union of Pure and Applied Chemistry, eds. (1992). Perspectives in catalysis. Oxford; Boston: Blackwell Scientific Publications. ISBN 978-0-632-03165-8.
- Thomas, John Meurig; Thomas, W. John (1997). Principles and practice of heterogeneous catalysis. Weinheim; New York: VCH. ISBN 3-527-29288-8.
- Zewail, Ahmed H.; Thomas, John Meurig (24 December 2009). 4D electron microscopy : imaging in space and time. London: Imperial College Press. ISBN 978-1-84816-400-0.
- Thomas, John Meurig (2012). Design and applications of single-site heterogeneous catalysts : contributions to green chemistry, clean technology and sustainability. London: Imperial College Press.
- Thomas, John Meurig; Thomas, W. John (11 December 2014). Principles and practice of heterogeneous catalysis (2nd ed.). John Wiley & Sons – VCH. ISBN 978-3-527-29239-4.
- Thomas, John Meurig (2017). The Selected Papers of Sir John Meurig Thomas. World Scientific Europe. doi:10.1142/q0055. ISBN 978-1-78634-187-7.
- Thomas, John Meurig (2020). Architects of Structural Biology: Bragg, Perutz, Kendrew, Hodgkin. Oxford: Oxford University Press. ISBN 978-0-19-885450-0.

=== Part 1: On the design and application of solid catalysts ===
- Sheet silicates: Broad spectrum catalysts for organic synthesis.(See also U.S. Patent 4,999,319 (1985), which is the basis of the world's largest solvent-free, single-step production of ethyl acetate.)
- Uniform heterogeneous catalysts: The role of solid-state chemistry in their development and design.
- New micro-crystalline catalysts Bakerian Lecture 1990.
- Solid acid catalysts
- Heterogeneous catalysts obtained by grafting metallocene complexes onto mesoporous silica
- Design, synthesis and in situ characterisation of new solid catalysts (Linus Pauling Lecture, California Institute of Technology, March 1999 and Karl Ziegler Lecture, Max Planck Institute, Mülheim, November 1998.)
- Molecular sieve catalysts for the regioselective and shape-selective oxyfunctionalization of alkanes in air
- Solvent-free routes to clean technology
- Constraining asymmetric organometallic catalysts within mesoporous supports boosts their enantioselectivity
- Highly efficient, one-step conversion of cyclohexane to adipic acid using single-site heterogeneous catalysts
- Design of a "green" one-step catalytic production of ε-caprolactam (precursor of nylon-6) See also
- The advantages and future potential of single-site heterogeneous catalysts
- Single-site photocatalytic solids for the decomposition of undesirable molecules (Focus Article)
- Innovations in oxidation catalysis leading to a sustainable society
- Systematic enumeration of microporous solids: Towards designer catalysts
- Facile, one-step production of niacin (vitamin B3) and other nitrogen-containing pharmaceutical chemicals with a single-site heterogeneous catalyst
- Nanoporous oxidic solids: The confluence of heterogeneous and homogeneous catalysis(Based on a lecture at the Symposium of Molecular Frontiers held at the Swedish Academy of Sciences in May 2008).
- Heterogeneous catalysis: Enigmas, illusions, challenges, realities, and emergent strategies of design
- Can a single atom serve as the active site in some heterogeneous catalysts?
- The principles of solid state chemistry hold the key to the successful design of heterogeneous catalysts for environmentally responsible processes

=== Part 2: On new techniques ===
- Tracing the conversion of aurichalcite to a copper catalyst by combined X-ray absorption and diffraction
- Review lecture: Topography and topology in solid-state chemistry
- Resolving crystallographically distinct tetrahedral sites in silicalite and ZSM-5 by solid-state NMR
- Revolutionary developments from atomic to extended structural imaging
- Nanotomography in the chemical, biological and materials sciences see also
- Mono- bi- and multifunctional single sites: exploring the interface between heterogeneous and homogeneous catalysis
- The modern electron microscope: A cornucopia of chemico-physical insights

Cultural offices
Preceded by Sir George Porter	Director of the Royal Institution; 1986–1991	Succeeded by Peter Day
Academic offices
Preceded by The Very Rev'd Henry Chadwick	Master of Peterhouse, Cambridge; 1993–2002	Succeeded by Lord Wilson of Tillyorn
