= Flash photolysis =

Chemical excitation technique

Flash photolysis is a pump-probe laboratory technique, in which a sample is first excited by a strong pulse of light from a pulsed laser of nanosecond, picosecond, or femtosecond pulse width or by another short-pulse light source such as a flash lamp. This first strong pulse is called the pump pulse and starts a chemical reaction or leads to an increased population for energy levels other than the ground state within a sample of atoms or molecules. Typically the absorption of light by the sample is recorded within short time intervals (by a so-called test or probe pulses) to monitor relaxation or reaction processes initiated by the pump pulse.

Flash photolysis was developed shortly after World War II as an outgrowth of attempts by military scientists to build cameras fast enough to photograph missiles in flight. The technique was developed in 1949 by Manfred Eigen, Ronald George Wreyford Norrish and George Porter, who won the 1967 Nobel Prize in Chemistry for this invention. Over the next 40 years the technique became more powerful and sophisticated due to developments in optics and lasers. Interest in this method grew considerably as its practical applications expanded from chemistry to areas such as biology, materials science, and environmental sciences. Today, flash photolysis facilities are extensively used by researchers to study light-induced processes in organic molecules, polymers, nanoparticles, semiconductors, photosynthesis in plants, signaling, and light-induced conformational changes in biological systems.

== See also ==
- Attophysics (1 attosecond = 10^{−18} s)
- Femtochemistry
- Femtotechnology
- Ultrafast laser spectroscopy
- Ultrashort pulse
