= Eric Rideal =

British physical chemist

Sir Eric Rideal MBE FRS FRIC

Professor of Physical Chemistry, King's College, London
- In office 1950–1955

Fullerian Professor of Chemistry, Royal Institution
- In office 1946–1949

Professor of Colloid Science, University of Cambridge
- In office 1930–1946

Personal details
- Born: Eric Keightley Rideal; 11 April 1890 Sydenham, Kent, England
- Died: 25 September 1974 (aged 84) West Kensington, London, England
- Education: Trinity Hall, Cambridge; University of Bonn
- Occupation: Physical chemist

Sir Eric Keightley Rideal (11 April 1890 – 25 September 1974) was a British physical chemist. He worked on a wide range of subjects, including electrochemistry, chemical kinetics, catalysis, electrophoresis, colloids and surface chemistry. He is best known for the Eley–Rideal mechanism, which he proposed in 1938 with Daniel D. Eley. He is also known for the textbook that he authored, An Introduction to Surface Chemistry (1926), and was awarded honours for the research he carried out during both World Wars and for his services to chemistry.

== Early years ==
Eric Keightley Rideal was born on 11 April 1890 in Sydenham, which at that time was part of the county of Kent. His father was chemist Samuel Rideal, whose work on water purification and disinfection included the Rideal–Walker test. His mother was Elizabeth Keightley, daughter of Samuel Keightley. Rideal was educated at Farnham Grammar School, Surrey, and then at Oundle School, Northamptonshire. In 1907 he won a scholarship in Natural Sciences to Trinity Hall, Cambridge. After graduating in 1910, he continued his studies in Germany, obtaining his PhD in chemistry in 1912 at the University of Bonn under Richard Anschütz.

When World War I broke out, Rideal was working on water supplies in Ecuador, an assignment that had come to him through his father. He returned home and enlisted with the Artists Rifles, eventually serving on the Western Front at the Somme in 1916 with the Royal Engineers. He was invalided home the same year after an outbreak of dysentery, and spent the rest of the war carrying out research in catalysis at University College London under Frederick G. Donnan.

During this period he also worked with Hugh Stott Taylor, co-authoring Catalysis in Theory and Practice (1919), described as a "seminal" work in the field.

Rideal was made MBE in 1918 for his war work.

== Career and research ==
Following the war, Rideal went to the US in 1919 to take a position for a year as visiting professor at the University of Illinois, a position for which he had been recommended by James Kendall. He then returned to the UK to take up a fellowship at his old college (Trinity Hall), and the Humphrey Owen Jones lectureship in physical chemistry at Cambridge. It was on the return voyage from the US by ship in 1920 that he met his future wife Peggy (Margaret Atlee Jackson), whom he married the following year.

Rideal remained at Cambridge for the next 26 years, becoming Professor of Colloid Science in 1930, the same year he was made a Fellow of the Royal Society. During this time, he founded the Colloid Science Laboratory which became a world centre for surface science, and was used for war work during World War II. Rideal's students at Cambridge included the physicist and future novelist C. P. Snow, and the future Nobel laureate Ronald G. W. Norrish. Snow later depicted Rideal in two of his novels: The Search (1934) and Strangers and Brothers (1940). Rideal's career at Cambridge was disrupted by an operation in 1936 for an intestinal tumour, an operation that left him with a colectomy and dissuaded him from applying for the vacant chair of physical chemistry in 1937.

Following World War II, Rideal left Cambridge to take up the position of Fullerian Professor of Chemistry at the Royal Institution in London (1946 to 1949). This was followed by a period at King's College London (1950 to 1955). After his retirement in 1955, Rideal took up a position as senior research fellow at Imperial College, enabling him to write the book Concepts in Catalysis (1968). It is estimated that over a period of some 60 years, Rideal authored or co-authored nearly 300 papers and a dozen books.

During his career, Rideal also gave a number of public lectures. These included the Cantor Lecture of the Royal Society of Arts (1921, 1924 and 1948). He also delivered the 1932 Robert Boyle Lecture, titled 'On some aspects of adsorption'. In 1947, Rideal gave the Royal Institution Christmas Lectures, entitled 'Chemical Reactions: How They Work'.

In 1949, Rideal was one of the founding editors of the journal Advances in Catalysis.

== Awards and honours ==
Rideal was awarded the Davy Medal of the Royal Society in 1951 "For his distinguished contributions to the subject of surface chemistry".

He was knighted in the 1951 King's Birthday Honours List for his services to the Ministry of Supply during World War II.

Also in 1951, he delivered the Bakerian Lecture with the title 'On Reactions in Monolayers'. Between 1951 and 1967 Rideal received honorary degrees from the universities of Dublin, Birmingham, Brunel, Belfast, Turin, and Bonn.

He was President of the Faraday Society (1938 to 1945), the Society of Chemical Industry (1945 to 1946), and the Chemical Society (1950 to 1952). He was elected a Fellow of King's College London in 1963.

== Later years ==
Rideal died on 25 September 1974 in West Kensington, London. His obituary was published in The Times.

== Legacy ==
Rideal's name is still honoured today, with bursaries, grants, lectures and conferences named for him. The travel bursaries are administered jointly in the form of the Rideal Trust by the Royal Society of Chemistry and the Society of Chemical Industry.

The Tadion–Rideal Prize for Molecular Science is an annual grant awarded by King's College London since 1983.

The Sir Eric Rideal Lecture is a lectureship awarded every year since 1970 by the Society of Chemical Industry.

The Rideal Conference is a triennial UK research conference on surface science and catalysis. It started in 1962 as the Chemisorption and Catalysis Conference and was renamed in his honour in 1971, with the 19th conference scheduled to take place in March 2018.

== Selected works ==
- Catalysis in Theory and Practice (1919, co-author)
- Industrial electrometallurgy (1919)
- Ozone (1920)
- An Introduction to Surface Chemistry (1926)
- Interfacial Phenomena (1963, co-author)
- Concepts in Catalysis (1968)
- Sixty Years of Chemistry (1970)
