= Susan Greenfield, Baroness Greenfield =

British scientist

The Right Honourable The Baroness Greenfield CBE, FRCP
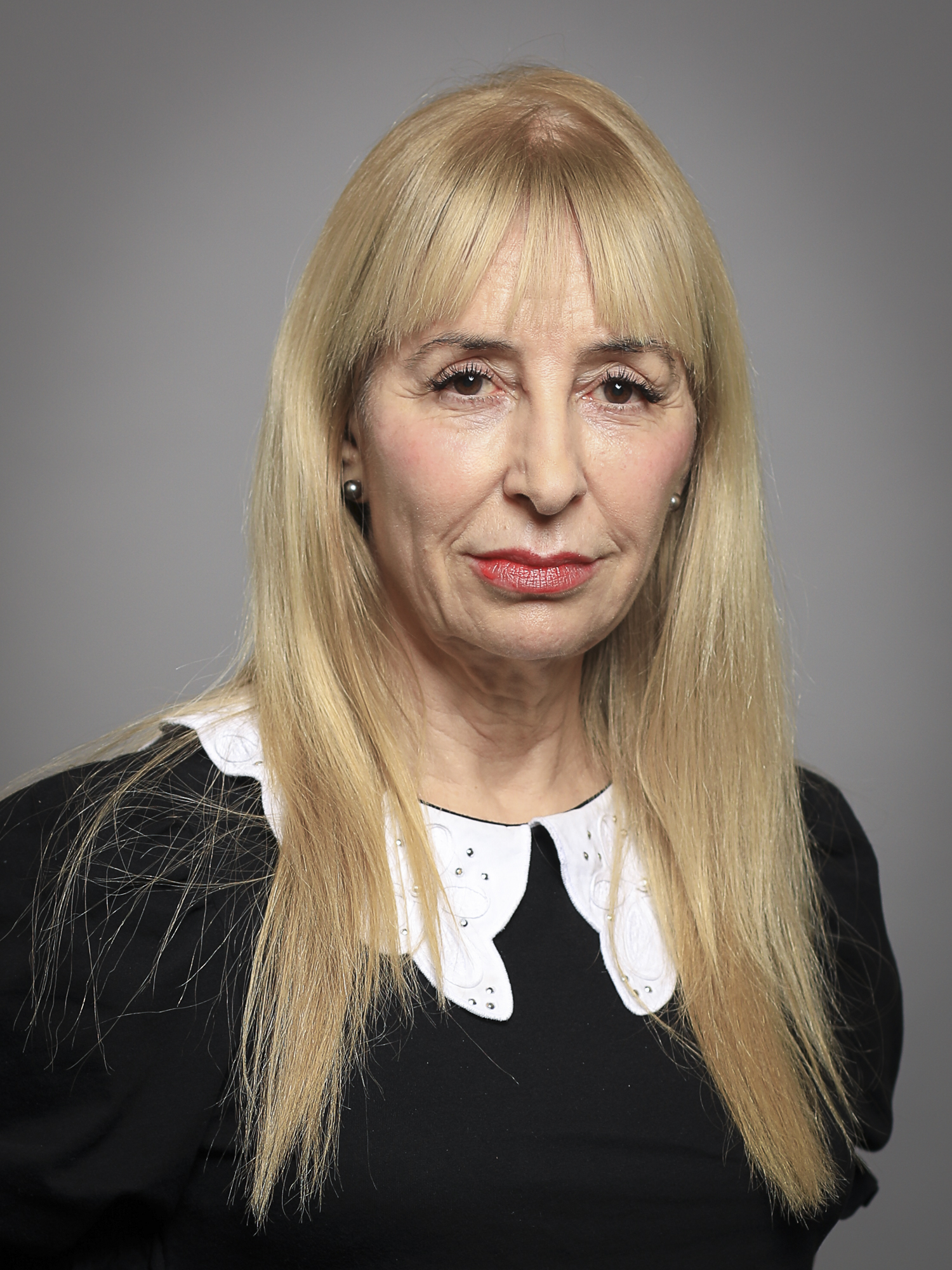
- Born: Susan Adele Greenfield; 1 October 1950 (age 76); Chiswick, London, England
- Education: St Hilda's College, Oxford
- Spouse: Peter Atkins (m. 1991; div. 2005)
- Awards: CBE, Knight of the Legion of Honour
- Scientific career
- Workplaces: University of Oxford; Royal Institution of Great Britain; Heriot-Watt University; Lincoln College, Oxford; House of Lords
- Thesis: Origins of acetylcholinesterase in cerebrospinal fluid (1977)
- Doctoral advisor: Anthony David Smith
- Susan Greenfield's voice Recorded February 2011 from the BBC Radio 4 programme Four Thought

Member of the House of Lords
- Lord Temporal
- Life peerage 18 June 2001
- Website: www.susangreenfield.com

Susan Adele Greenfield, Baroness Greenfield, CBE, FRCP (born 1 October 1950) is an English scientist, writer, broadcaster and member of the House of Lords (since 2001). Her research has focused on the treatment of Parkinson's disease and Alzheimer's disease. She is also interested in the neuroscience of consciousness and the impact of technology on the brain.

Greenfield is a senior research fellow at Lincoln College, Oxford; she was a professor of Synaptic Pharmacology.

Greenfield was chancellor of Heriot-Watt University in Edinburgh between 2005 and 2013. From 1998 to 2010, she was director of the Royal Institution of Great Britain. In September 2013, she co-founded the biotech company Neuro-bio Ltd, where she is chief executive officer.

== Early life ==
Greenfield's mother, Doris (née Thorp), was a dancer and a Christian, and her father, Reginald Myer Greenfield, was an electrician who was the son of a Yiddish-speaking Jewish immigrant from Austria; her grandmothers never spoke to each other and she said of them, "the prejudice was equally vociferous on both sides".

== Education ==
She attended the Godolphin and Latymer School, where she took A levels in Latin, Greek and ancient history, and maths. The first member of her immediate family to go to university, she was initially admitted to St Hilda's College to read Philosophy and Psychology, but changed course and graduated with a first-class degree in experimental psychology. As a Senior Scholar at St Hugh's College, Oxford, she completed her DPhil degree in 1977 under the supervision of Anthony David Smith on the Origins of acetylcholinesterase in cerebrospinal fluid.

She then held a junior research fellowship at Green College, Oxford between 1981 and 1984.

== Career ==
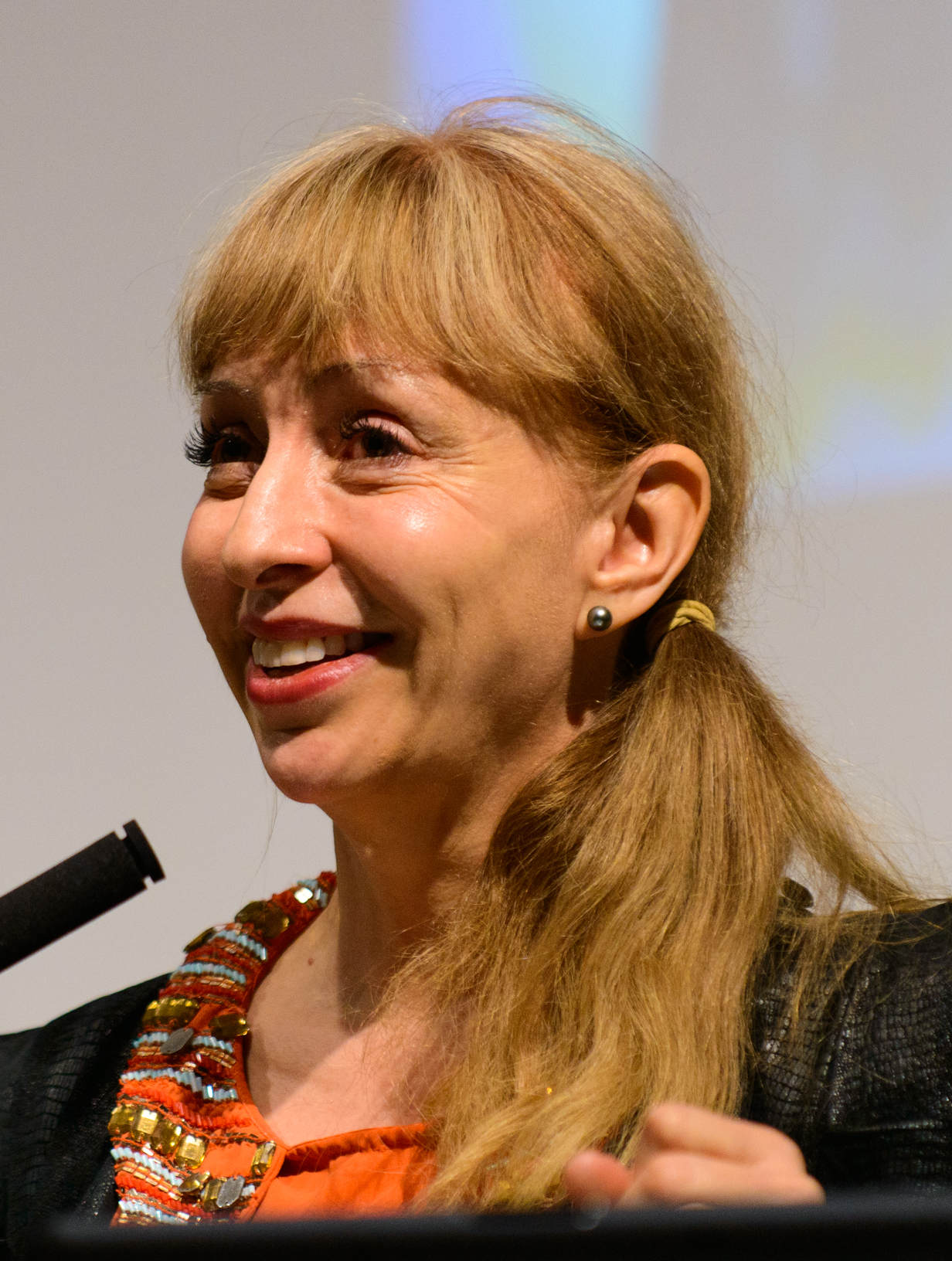
Greenfield at Senedd Cymru – Welsh Parliament; 2013

Greenfield's research is focused on brain physiology, particularly on the brain mechanisms of Parkinson's and Alzheimer's diseases. She is also known for her role in popularising science. Greenfield has written several books about the brain, regularly gives public lectures, and appears on radio and television.

Since 1976, Greenfield has published approximately 200 papers in peer-reviewed journals, including studies on brain mechanisms involved in addiction and reward, relating to dopamine systems and other neurochemicals. She investigated the brain mechanisms underlying attention deficit hyperactivity disorder (ADHD) as well as the impact of environmental enrichment.

In 1994, she was the first woman to give the Royal Institution Christmas Lectures, then sponsored by the BBC. Her lectures were titled "Journey to the centre of the brain". She was appointed Director of the Royal Institution in 1998. The post was abolished in 2010. The Royal Institution had found itself in a financial crisis following a £22m development programme led by Greenfield and the board. The project ended £3 million in debt. Greenfield subsequently announced that she would be taking her employers to an employment tribunal and her claim would include discrimination. The case was settled out of court.

Greenfield's two main positions at Oxford were Tutorial Fellow in Medicine at Lincoln College Oxford, and Professor of Synaptic Pharmacology. Between 1995 and 1999, she gave public lectures as Gresham Professor of Physic in London. Greenfield was Adelaide's Thinker in Residence for 2004 and 2005.

As a result of her recommendations, South Australian Premier Mike Rann made a major funding commitment, backed by the state and federal governments and the private sector, to establish the Royal Institution of Australia and the Australian Science Media Centre in Adelaide.

She has explored the relevance of neuroscience knowledge to education and has used the phrase "mind change", an umbrella term comparable to "climate change", encompassing diverse issues involved in the impact of the 21st-century environment on the brain.

In 2013 she co-founded the biotech company Neuro-Bio Ltd which develops diagnostic tests and therapeutics for Alzheimer's disease. The company has found that the C terminus of acetylcholinesterase can be cleaved and that the resulting peptide can kill neurons; the company has also found that a cyclic peptide analogue could prevent that neuronal death. The company raised around $4 million in 2017.

== Politics ==
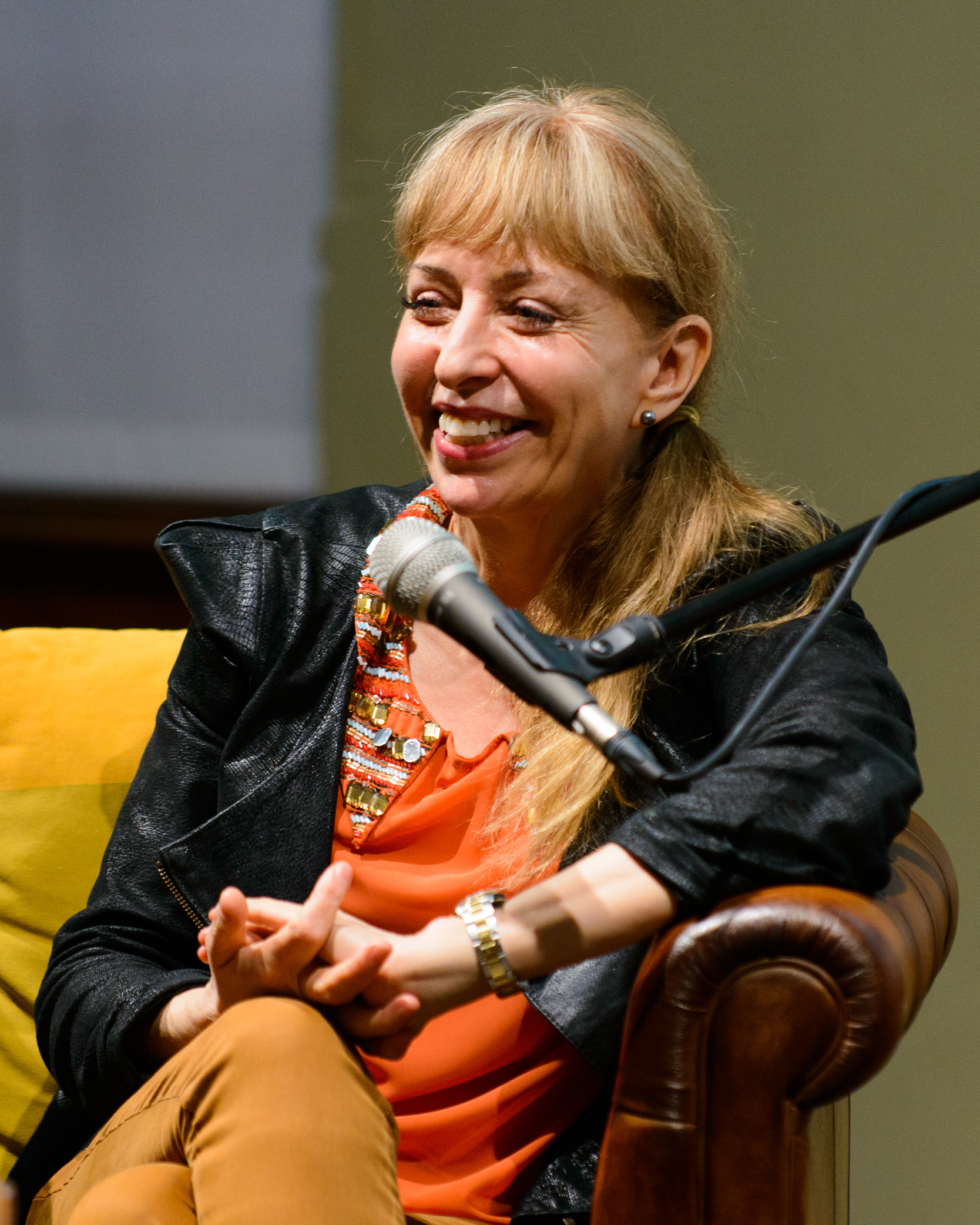
Greenfield in 2013

Greenfield sits in the Parliament of the United Kingdom in the House of Lords as a crossbencher, having no formal political affiliation. Records of Greenfield's activity in the House of Lords indicate abstention on a range of issues. She has spoken on a variety of topics, including education, drugs, and economic empowerment for women.

== Books ==
In 2013, Greenfield published a dystopian science-fiction novel, 2121: A Tale from the Next Century, telling the story of videogame-playing hedonists and their conflict with "Neo-Puritans".

In 2014, Greenfield published a popular science book called Mind Change: How Digital Technologies are Leaving their Mark on our Brains, describing her ideas about the impact of digital technology.

== Impact of digital technology controversy ==
Greenfield has expressed concerns that internet usage may modify the brain structures of youngsters.

She has had controversy surrounding her opinions on the relationship between technology use and Autism Spectrum Disorder. She originally linked the increase in Autism Spectrum Disorder diagnosis to increased screen-time in a 2011 New Scientist article. She defended this claim in 2014, in an interview with Stephen Sackur, on the BBC show HARDTalk, in which she claims to have collated 500 articles "in support of the possible problematic effects" of technology-use.

She noted that Public Health England had related social networking and multiplayer online games to "lower levels of wellbeing", and believed that evidence pointed to a "dose response" relationship, "where each additional hour of viewing increases the likelihood of experiencing socio-emotional problems". She believed this raised questions about where to draw the boundaries between beneficial and harmful use of such technology, saying that "it would be surprising if many hours per day of screen activity did not influence this neuroplasticity".

== Honours ==
As of 2016, Greenfield has 32 honorary degrees; has received awards including the Royal Society's Michael Faraday Prize. She has been elected to an Honorary Fellowship of the Royal College of Physicians and the London Science Museum.

In 2006 she was made an Honorary Fellow of the British Science Association and was the Honorary Australian of the Year.

In January 2000, Greenfield received a CBE for her contribution to the public understanding of science. Later that year, she was named Woman of the Year by The Observer. In 2001, she became a Life Peer under the House of Lords Appointments Commission system, as Baroness Greenfield, of Ot Moor, Oxfordshire. Like the other people's peers she was self-nominated.

In 2003, she was appointed a Knight of the Legion of Honour by the French Government. In 2010 she was awarded the Australian Society for Medical Research Medal. She received the British Inspiration award for Science and Technology in 2010.

== Patronage ==
She is a patron of Alzheimer's Research UK and of Dignity in Dying. She is a founder and trustee of the charity Science for Humanity, a network of scientists, researchers and technologists that collaborates with not-for-profit organisations to create practical solutions to the everyday problems of developing communities.

== Personal life ==
Greenfield was married to the University of Oxford professor Peter Atkins from 1991 until their divorce in 2005.

== Bibliography ==
- Greenfield, Susan (1995). Journey to the Centers of the Mind: Toward a Science of Consciousness. San Francisco, California: W.H. Freeman. ISBN 0-7167-2723-4.
- Greenfield, Susan (1997). The Human Brain: A Guided Tour (Science Masters Series). New York: Basic Books. pp. 160 pages. ISBN 0-465-00726-0.
- Greenfield, Susan (2002). The Private Life of the Brain (Penguin Press Science). London, UK: Penguin Books Ltd. pp. 272 pages. ISBN 0-14-100720-6.
- Greenfield, Susan (2003). Tomorrow's People: How 21st Century Technology is Changing the Way we Think and Feel. London, UK: Allen Lane. pp. 304 pages. ISBN 0-7139-9631-5.
- Greenfield, Susan (2006). Inside the Body. London, UK: Cassell Illustrated. pp. 288 pages. ISBN 1-84403-500-X.
- Greenfield, Susan (2008). ID: The Quest for Identity in the 21st Century. London, UK: Sceptre. pp. 320 pages. ISBN 978-0-340-93600-9.
- Greenfield, Susan (2011). You and Me: The Neuroscience of Identity. London, UK: Notting Hill Editions. ISBN 978-1-907903-34-2.
- Greenfield, Susan (2013). 2121: A Tale from the Next Century. London, UK: Head of Zeus.
- Greenfield, Susan (2014). Mind Change: How 21st Century Technology is leaving its mark on the brain. London, UK: Random House.
- Greenfield, Susan. A Day in the Life of the Brain: The Neuroscience of Consciousness from Dawn till Dusk.

Academic offices
Preceded by Dame Anne McLaren	Fullerian Professor of Physiology; 1999–present	Succeeded by —
Cultural offices
Preceded by Peter Day	Director of the Royal Institution; 1998–2010	Succeeded by Post abolished
