= List of fellows of the Royal Society elected in 1936 =

Fellows of the Royal Society elected in 1936.

== Fellows ==
1. Alexander Craig Aitken
2. Sir John Douglas Cockcroft
3. Herbert John Fleure
4. Sir Clive Forster-Cooper
5. Sir Alexander Gibb
6. Sir Henry Lewis Guy
7. Henry George Albert Hickling
8. Lancelot Thomas Hogben
9. Joseph Kenyon
10. Edgar Hartley Kettle
11. Sir Nevill Francis Mott
12. Ronald George Wreyford Norrish
13. Harry Hemley Plaskett
14. Ernest Frederick Relf
15. Francis John Worsley Roughton
16. Birbal Sahni
17. Ernest Basil Verney

== Foreign members ==
1. Sigmund Freud
2. Ludwig Jost
3. Felix Andries Vening Meinesz
4. Hermann Weyl

== Statute 12 ==
1. Sir Thomas Hudson Middleton
