= Lawrence Bragg =

Australian and British X-ray crystallographer (1890–1971)

Sir Lawrence Bragg CH OBE MC FRS
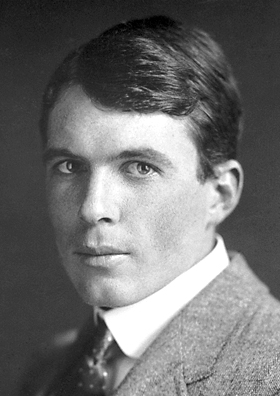
- Bragg in 1915

3rd Director of the National Physical Laboratory
- In office 1937–1938
- Preceded by: Sir Frank Edward Smith (acting)
- Succeeded by: Sir Charles Galton Darwin

Personal details
- Born: William Lawrence Bragg; 31 March 1890 Adelaide, South Australia
- Died: 1 July 1971 (aged 81) Ipswich, England
- Spouse: Alice Hopkinson (m. 1921)
- Children: 4, including Stephen
- Parent: William Henry Bragg (father)
- Relatives: Charles Todd (grandfather)
- Education: University of Adelaide (BA); University of Cambridge (BA)
- Known for: Bragg's law
- Awards: Matteucci Medal (1915); Nobel Prize in Physics (1915); Hughes Medal (1931); Royal Medal (1946); Copley Medal (1966)
- Scientific career
- Fields: X-ray crystallography
- Workplaces: Trinity College, Cambridge; Victoria University of Manchester; National Physical Laboratory; University of Cambridge; Royal Institution
- Academic advisors: J. J. Thomson; William Henry Bragg
- Doctoral students: Max Perutz; Alex Stokes; Evan James Williams
- Other notable students: George W. Brindley; Sivaramakrishna Chandrasekhar; John Crank; Marcelo Damy; Isidor Fankuchen; Peter Hirsch; John Kendrew; W. H. Zachariasen

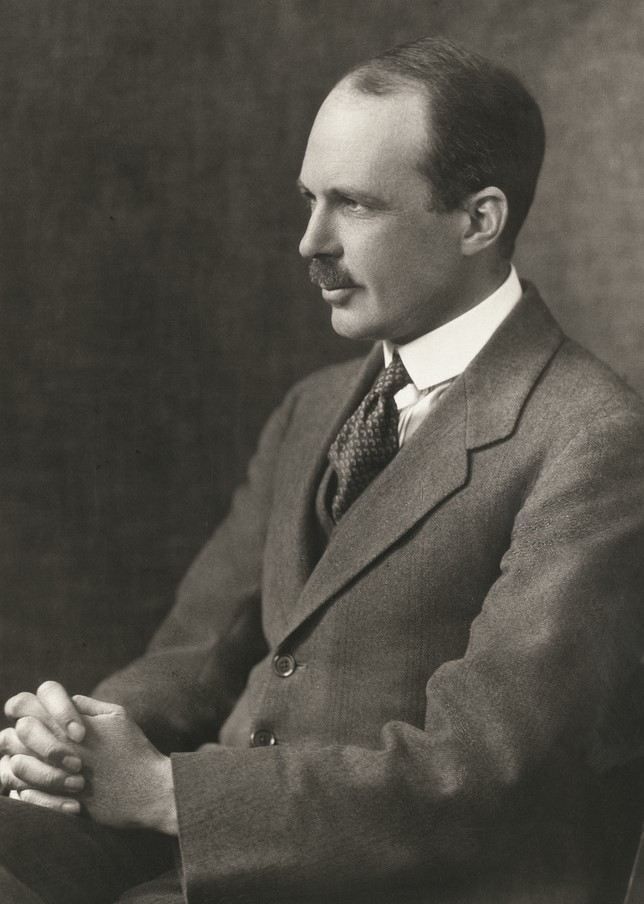
Portrait of William Lawrence Bragg, 1930

Sir William Lawrence Bragg (31 March 1890 – 1 July 1971) was an Australian and British X-ray crystallographer who uniquely (Note: This is still a unique accomplishment, because no other parent-child combination has yet shared a Nobel Prize (in any field). In several cases, a parent has won a Nobel Prize, and then years later, the child has won the Nobel Prize for separate research. An example of this is with Marie Curie and her daughter Irène Joliot-Curie, who are the only mother-daughter pair. Several father-son pairs have won two separate Nobel Prizes.) shared a Nobel Prize with his father William Henry Bragg – the 1915 Nobel Prize in Physics "for their services in the analysis of crystal structure by means of X-rays", an important step in the development of X-ray crystallography.

As of 2026, Bragg is the youngest ever Nobel laureate in physics, or in any science category, having received the award at the age of 25. Bragg was the director of the Cavendish Laboratory, Cambridge, when James D. Watson and Francis Crick reported the discovery of the structure of DNA in February 1953.

== Education ==
William Lawrence Bragg was born on 31 March 1890 in Adelaide, South Australia, the son of William Henry Bragg (1862–1942), who was appointed Elder Professor of Mathematics and Physics at the University of Adelaide in 1885, and Gwendoline Todd (1869–1929), the daughter of Charles Todd, government astronomer of South Australia.

Bragg attended St Peter's College, Adelaide, before going to the University of Adelaide in 1904 to study mathematics, chemistry, and physics. In 1908, he graduated from university and moved to England, where his father accepted the Cavendish Chair of Physics at the University of Leeds. Bragg entered Trinity College, Cambridge, in the autumn of 1909, receiving a major scholarship in mathematics, despite taking the exam while in bed with pneumonia. After initially excelling in mathematics, he transferred to the physics course in the later years of his studies, and graduated in 1912 with first-class honours in the Natural Sciences Tripos. In 1914, he became Fellow and Lecturer in Natural Sciences at Trinity College.

Among Bragg's other interests was shell collecting; his personal collection amounted to specimens from some 500 species; all personally collected from South Australia. He discovered a new species of cuttlefish – Sepia braggi, named for him by Joseph Verco.

== Career and research ==
=== X-rays and the Bragg equation ===
In 1912, as a first-year research student at Cambridge, W. L. Bragg, while strolling by the river, had the insight that crystals made from parallel sheets of atoms would not diffract X-ray beams that struck their surface at most angles because X-rays deflected by collisions with atoms would be out of phase, cancelling one another out. However, when the X-ray beam struck at an angle at which the distances it passed between atomic sheets in the crystal equalled the X-ray's wavelength then those deflected would be in phase and produce a spot on a nearby film. From this insight he wrote the simple Bragg equation that relates the wavelength of the X-ray and the distance between atomic sheets in a simple crystal to the angles at which an impinging X-ray beam would be reflected.

His father built an apparatus in which a crystal could be rotated to precise angles while measuring the energy of reflections. This enabled father and son to measure the distances between the atomic sheets in a number of simple crystals. They calculated the spacing of the atoms from the weight of the crystal and the Avogadro constant, which enabled them to measure the wavelengths of the X-rays produced by different metallic targets in the X-ray tubes. W. H. Bragg reported their results at meetings and in a paper, giving credit to "his son" (unnamed) for the equation, but not as a co-author, which gave his son "some heartaches", which he never overcame.

=== Work on sound ranging ===
Bragg was commissioned early in World War I in the Royal Horse Artillery as a second lieutenant of the Leicestershire battery. In 1915 he was seconded to the Royal Engineers to develop a method to localise enemy artillery from the boom of their firing. On 2 September 1915 his brother was killed during the Gallipoli Campaign. Shortly afterwards, he and his father were awarded the Nobel Prize in Physics. He was 25 years old and remains the youngest science laureate. The problem with sound ranging was that the heavy guns boomed at too low a frequency to be detected by a microphone. After months of frustrating failure he and his group devised a hot wire air wave detector that solved the problem. In this work he was aided by Charles Galton Darwin, William Sansome Tucker, Harold Roper Robinson, Edward Andrade and Henry Harold Hemming. British sound ranging was very effective; there was a unit in every British Army and their system was adopted by the Americans when they entered the war. For his work during the war, he was awarded the Military Cross and appointed an Officer of the Order of the British Empire (OBE). He was also mentioned in dispatches on 16 June 1916, 4 January 1917 and 7 July 1919.

Hot wire sound ranging was used in World War II during which he served as a civilian adviser.

Between the wars, from 1919 to 1937, he worked at the Victoria University of Manchester as Langworthy Professor of Physics. He became the director of the National Physical Laboratory in Teddington in 1937.

After World War II, Bragg returned to Cambridge, splitting the Cavendish Laboratory into research groups. He believed that "the ideal research unit is one of six to twelve scientists and a few assistants". During this time one of his team working on crystallography was French exile Adrienne Weill.

=== University of Manchester ===
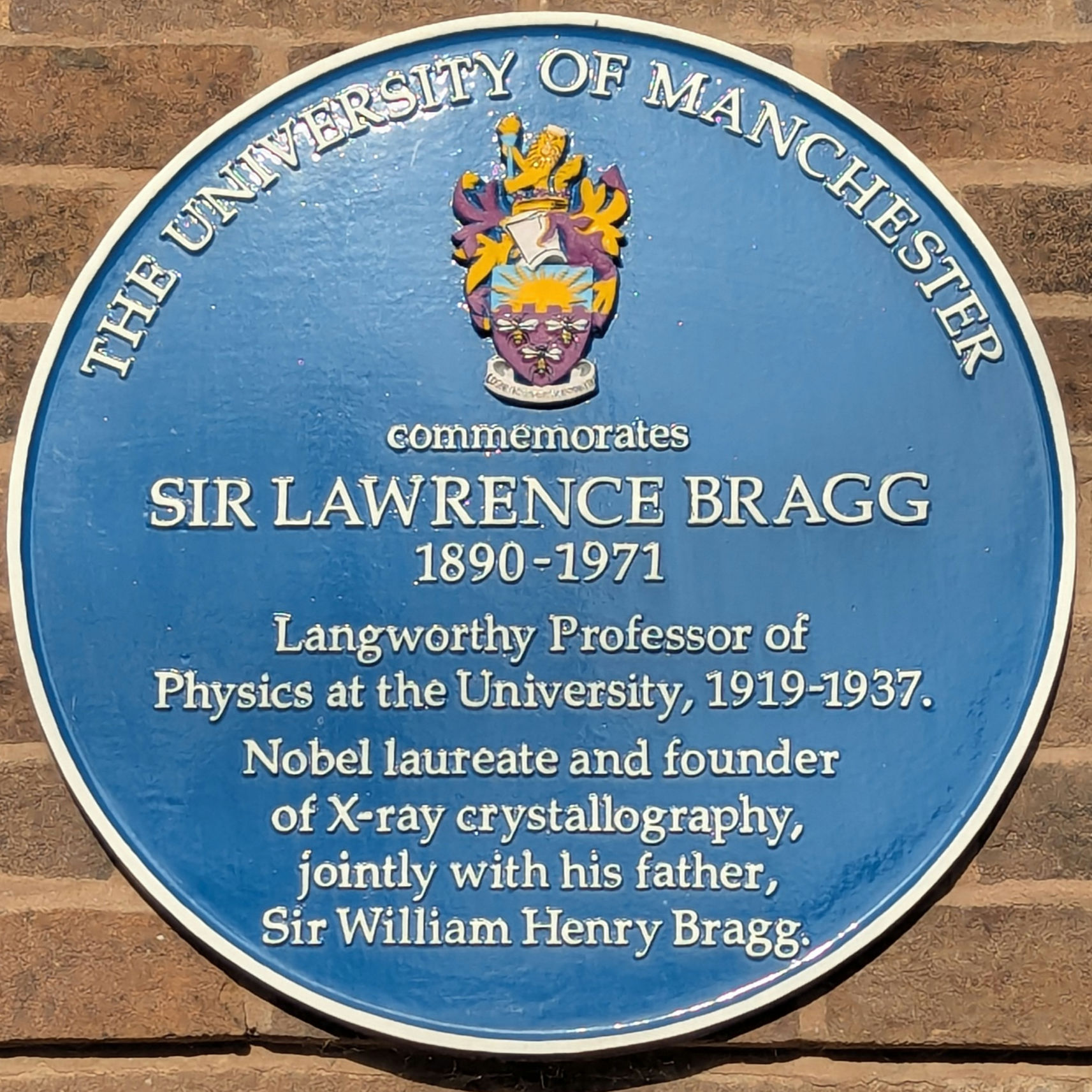
A blue plaque commemorating Bragg's work at the University of Manchester.

When demobilised he returned to crystallography at Cambridge. They had agreed that father would study organic crystals, son would investigate inorganic compounds. In 1919 when Ernest Rutherford, a long-time family friend, moved to Cambridge, Lawrence Bragg replaced him as Langworthy Professor of Physics at the Victoria University of Manchester and was elected to membership of the Manchester Literary and Philosophical Society on 4.11.1919. He recruited an excellent faculty, including former sound rangers, but he believed that his knowledge of physics was weak and he had no classroom experience. The students, many veterans, were critical and rowdy. He was deeply shaken but with family support he pulled himself together and prevailed. He and R. W. James measured the absolute energy of reflected X-rays, which validated a formula derived by C. G. Darwin before the war. Now they could determine the number of electrons in the reflecting targets, and they were able to decipher the structures of more complicated crystals like silicates. It was still difficult: requiring repeated guessing and retrying. In the late 1920s they eased the analysis by using Fourier transforms on the data.

In 1930, he became deeply disturbed while considering a job offer from Imperial College London. His family rallied around and he recovered his balance while they spent 1931 in Munich, where he did research.

=== National Physical Laboratory ===
He became director of the National Physical Laboratory in Teddington in 1937, bringing some co-workers along. However, administration and committees took much of his time away from the workbench.

=== University of Cambridge ===
Rutherford died and the search committee nominated Lawrence Bragg as next in the line of the Cavendish Professors who directed the Cavendish Laboratory. The Laboratory had an eminent history in atomic physics and certain members were wary of appointing a crystallographer, which Bragg surmounted by even-handed administration. He worked on improving the interpretation of diffraction patterns. In the small crystallography group was a refugee research student without a mentor: Max Perutz. He showed Bragg X-ray diffraction data from haemoglobin, which suggested that the structure of giant biological molecules might be deciphered. Bragg appointed Perutz as his research assistant and within a few months obtained additional support with a grant from the Rockefeller Foundation. The work was suspended during the Second World War when Perutz was interned as an enemy alien and then worked in military research.

During the war the Cavendish offered a shortened graduate course which emphasised the electronics needed for radar. Bragg worked on the structure of metals and consulted on sonar and sound ranging, for which the Tucker microphone was still used. Bragg was knighted and became Sir Lawrence in 1941. After his father died in 1942, Bragg served for six months as Scientific Liaison Officer to Canada. He also organised periodic conferences on X-ray analysis, which was widely used in military research.

After the war Bragg led in the formation of the International Union of Crystallography and was elected its first president. He reorganised the Cavendish into units to reflect his conviction that "the ideal research unit is one of six to twelve scientists and a few assistants, helped by one or more first-class instrument mechanics and a workshop in which the general run of apparatus can be constructed". Senior members of staff now had offices, telephones, and secretarial support. The scope of the department was enlarged with a new unit on radio astronomy. Bragg's own work focused on the structure of metals, using both X-rays and the electron microscope. In 1947 he persuaded the Medical Research Council (MRC) to support what he described as the "gallant attempt" to determine protein structure as the Laboratory of Molecular Biology, initially consisting of Perutz, John Kendrew and two assistants. Bragg worked with them and by 1960 they had resolved the structure of myoglobin to the atomic level. After this Bragg was less involved; their analysis of haemoglobin was easier after they incorporated two mercury atoms as markers in each molecule. The first monumental triumph of the MRC was decoding the structure of DNA by James Watson and Francis Crick. Bragg announced the discovery at a Solvay conference on proteins in Belgium on 8 April 1953, though it went unreported by the press. He then gave a talk at Guy's Hospital Medical School in London on Thursday, 14 May 1953, which resulted in an article by Ritchie Calder in the News Chronicle of London on Friday, 15 May 1953, entitled "Why You Are You. Nearer Secret of Life". Bragg nominated Crick, Watson and Maurice Wilkins for the 1962 Nobel Prize in Physiology or Medicine; Wilkins' share recognised the contribution of X-ray crystallographers at King's College London. Among them was Rosalind Franklin, whose "photograph 51" showed that DNA was a double helix, not the triple helix that Linus Pauling had proposed. Franklin died before the prize (which only goes to living people) was awarded.

=== Royal Institution ===
In 1953 the Braggs moved into the elegant flat for the Resident Professor in the Royal Institution in London, the position his father had occupied when he died. In 1934 and 1961 Lawrence had delivered the Royal Institution Christmas Lecture and since 1938 he had been Professor of Natural Philosophy in the Institution, delivering an annual lecture. His father's successors had weakened the Institution, so Bragg had to rebuild it. He bolstered finances by enlisting corporate sponsors, the traditional Friday Evening Discourses were followed by a dinner party for the speaker and carefully selected possible patrons, more than 120 of them each year. "Two of these Discourses in 1965 gave him particular pleasure. On 7 May, Lady Bragg, who had been a member of the Royal Commission on Marriage and Divorce (1951–55) and was Chairman of the National Marriage Guidance Council, lectured on 'Changing patterns in marriage and divorce'; and on 15 November, Bragg listened with evident pride to the Discourse on 'Oscillations and noise in jet engines' given by his engineer-son Stephen, who was then Chief Scientist at Rolls-Royce Ltd and later became Vice-Chancellor of Brunel University." He also introduced a programme of highly regarded Schools' Lectures, enlivened by the elaborate demonstrations that were a hallmark of the Institution. He gave three of these lectures on "electricity".

He continued research in the Institution by recruiting a small group to work in the Davy-Faraday Laboratory in the basement and in the adjoining house, supported by grants he obtained. A visitor to the laboratory succeeded in inserting heavy metals into the enzyme lysozyme; the structure of its crystal was solved in 1965 at the Royal Institution by David Chilton Phillips and his coworkers, with the computations on the 9,040 reflections performed on the digital computer at the University of London, which greatly facilitated the work. Two of the illustrations of the positioning of amino acids in the chain were drawn by Bragg. Unlike myoglobin, in which nearly 80 per cent of the amino-acid residues are in the alpha-helix conformation, in lysozyme the alpha-helix content is only about 40 per cent of the amino-acid residues found in four main stretches. Other stretches are of the 3_{10} helix, a conformation that they had proposed earlier. In this conformation, every third peptide is hydrogen-bonded back to the first peptide, thus forming a ring containing ten atoms. They had the complete structure of an enzyme in time for Bragg's 75th birthday. He became Professor Emeritus in 1966.

X-ray analysis of protein structure flourished in subsequent years, determining the structures of scores of proteins in laboratories around the world. Twenty eight Nobel Prizes have been awarded for work using X-ray analysis. The disadvantage of the method is that it must be done on crystals, which precludes seeing changes in shape when enzymes bind substrates and the like. This problem was solved by the development of another line Bragg had initiated, using modified electron microscopes to image single frozen molecules: cryo-electron microscopy.

In his long association with the Royal Institution he was:

- Professor of Natural Philosophy, 1938–1953
- Fullerian Professor of Chemistry, 1954–1966
- Superintendent of the House, 1954–1966
- Director of the Davy-Faraday Research Laboratory, 1954–1966
- Director of the Royal Institution, 1965–1966
- Emeritus Professor, 1966–1971

== Personal life ==
In 1921, Bragg married Alice Hopkinson (1899–1989), a cousin of a Cecil Hopkinson (1891–1917), who shared rooms with Bragg, and was one of his closest friends whilst they were both studying at Cambridge. Cecil was the son of John Hopkinson who was Alice's uncle.

They had four children, the engineer Stephen Lawrence (1923–2014), David William (1926–2005), Margaret Alice (1931–2022) (who married the diplomat Mark Heath), and Patience Mary (1935–2020) (who married David, the son of George Paget Thomson the Nobel prize winning physicist). Alice was on the staff at Withington Girls' School until Bragg was appointed director of the National Physical Laboratory in 1937. She was active in a number of public bodies and served as Mayor of Cambridge from 1945 to 1946.

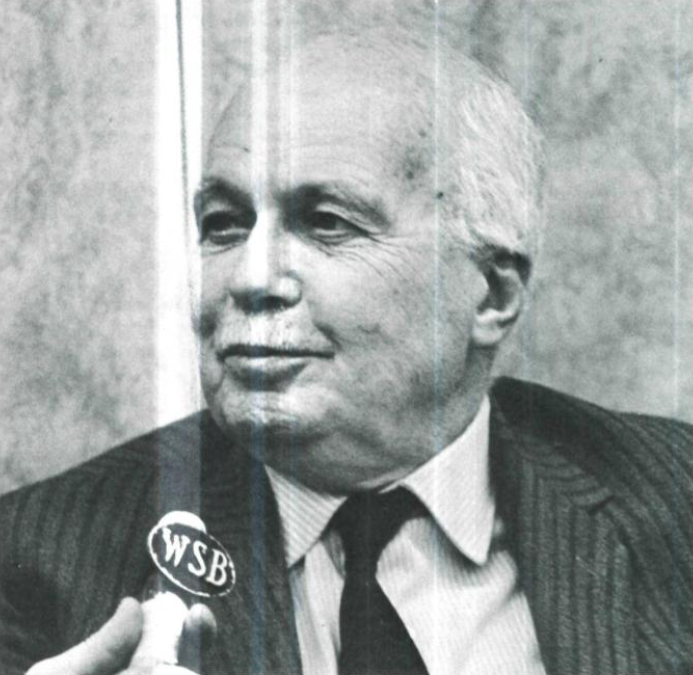
Bragg in 1967

Bragg's hobbies included drawing – family letters were illustrated with lively sketches – painting, literature and a lifelong interest in gardening. When he moved to London, he missed having a garden and so worked as a part-time gardener, unrecognised by his employer, until a guest at the house expressed surprise at seeing him there.

Bragg died on 1 July 1971 at a hospital near his home in Waldringfield, Ipswich, at the age of 81. He is buried at Trinity College, Cambridge. His son, David, is buried in the Parish of the Ascension Burial Ground in Cambridge, his grave is within a few paces of that of Bragg's close friend, Rudolph Cecil Hopkinson, who incurred a severe head wound in the 1914–19 war and died a few months after being invalided back to the UK.

In August 2013, Bragg's relative, the broadcaster Melvyn Bragg, presented a BBC Radio 4 programme ("Bragg on the Braggs") on the 1915 Nobel Prize in Physics winners.

== Recognition ==
=== Awards ===
Year	Organisation	Award	Citation	Ref.
1915	Accademia dei XL	Matteucci Medal	—	
1915	Royal Swedish Academy of Sciences	Nobel Prize in Physics	"For their [Lawrence and William Henry Bragg] services in the analysis of crystal structure by means of X-rays."	
1931	Royal Society	Hughes Medal	"For his pioneer work on the elucidation of crystal structure by X-ray analysis."	
1946	Royal Society	Royal Medal	"For his distinguished researches in the sciences of X-ray structure analysis and X-ray spectroscopy."	
1966	Royal Society	Copley Medal	"In recognition of his distinguished contributions to the development of methods of structural determination by X-ray diffraction."	

=== Honours ===
Year	Country	Honour	Ref.
1918	United Kingdom	Military Cross	
1918	United Kingdom	Officer of the Order of the British Empire	
1941	United Kingdom	Knight Bachelor	
1967	United Kingdom	Order of the Companions of Honour	

=== Memberships ===
Year	Organisation	Type	Ref.
1921	Royal Society	Fellow	
1943	American Philosophical Society	International Member	
1959	American Academy of Arts and Sciences	International Honorary Member	

== Commemoration ==
Since 1967, the Institute of Physics has awarded the Lawrence Bragg Medal and Prize. Additionally since 1992, the Australian Institute of Physics has awarded the Bragg Gold Medal for Excellence in Physics to commemorate Lawrence Bragg (in front on the medal) and his father, William Bragg, for the best PhD thesis by a student at an Australian university.

The Electoral district of Bragg, in the South Australian House of Assembly, was created in 1970, and was named after both William and Lawrence Bragg.

== See also ==
- List of Nobel laureates in Physics
- Tactical artillery terms from World War I
- Tube Alloys

== Notes ==
Academic offices
Preceded by Ernest Rutherford	Langworthy Professor at the University of Manchester; 1919–37	Succeeded by Patrick Blackett
Preceded by Ernest Rutherford	Cavendish Professor of Experimental Physics, University of Cambridge; 1938–1953	Succeeded by Nevill Mott
Professional and academic associations
Preceded by Herbert Levinstein	President of the Manchester Literary and Philosophical Society; 1927–29	Succeeded by Charles Edmond Stromeyer
