= Katherine Mathieson =

British science writer (born 1975)

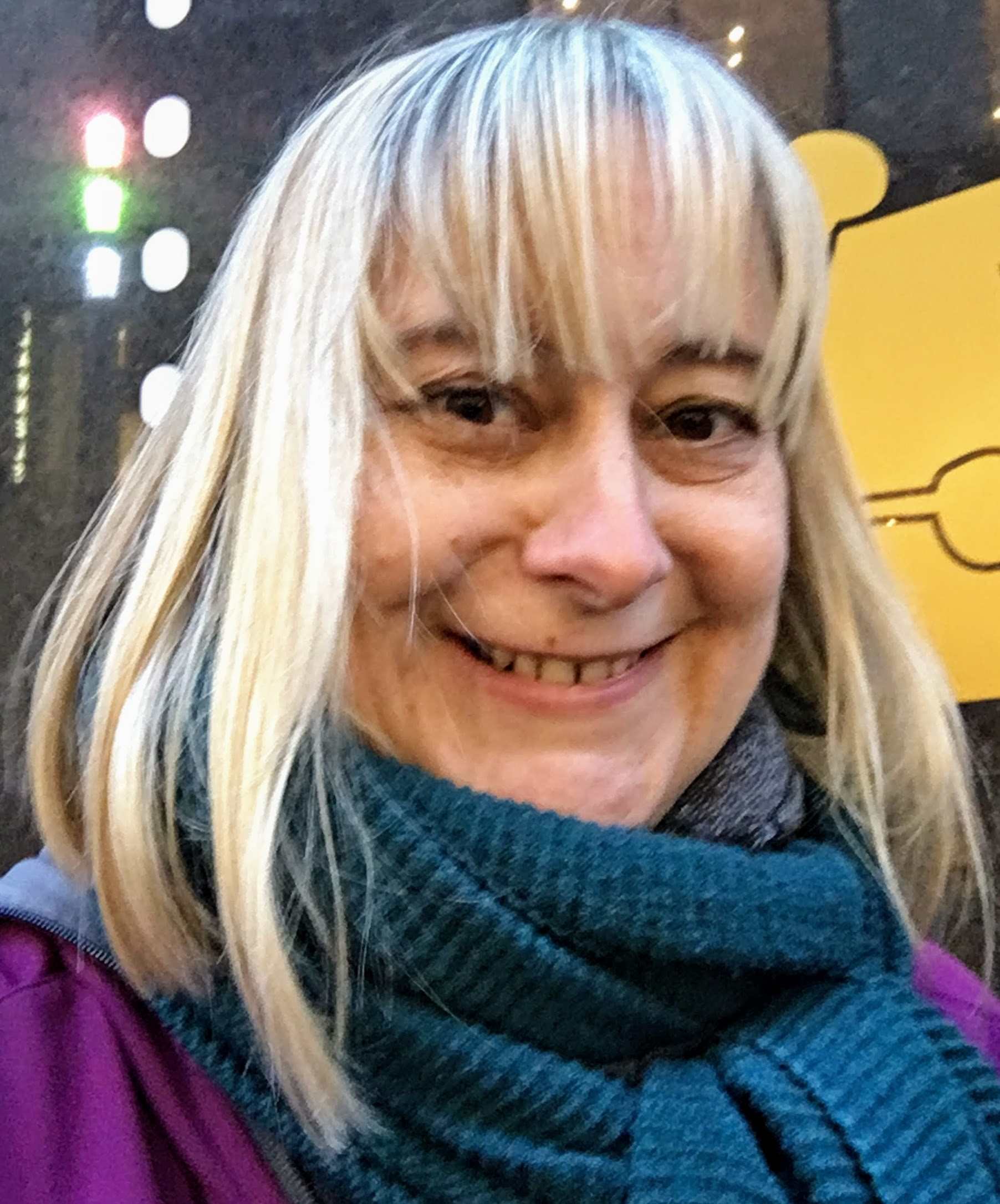
- Born: 17 August 1975 (age 51); Durham, England
- Education: Selwyn College, Cambridge Imperial College London; University of London Cass Business School
- Known for: Science communication
- Scientific career
- Workplaces: British Science Association

Katherine Theresa Stewart Mathieson (born 17 August 1975) is the Director of the Royal Institution and former Chief Executive of the British Science Association. She previously led the science education projects at Nesta.

== Early life and education ==
Mathieson was born on 17 August 1975 in Durham, the daughter of Martin and Susan Mathieson. She received her BSc in Natural Sciences from Selwyn College, Cambridge in 1996. She completed a Masters in Science Communication at Imperial College London in 1999. She earned two postgraduate diplomas, in Information Science from the City University of London in 2003 and in Voluntary Sector Management from Cass Business School in 2011.

== Career ==
Mathieson worked as a GP rep for Merck & Co. from 1996 to 1998. In 1999, she became a Science Information Officer for Science Line until joining the Forensic Science Service as an Information Scientist from 2000 to 2002. Mathieson led science education and enterprise education at Nesta from 2000. She contributed to the Institute of Physics' report Girls in the Physics Classroom. As Director of Education at the British Science Association, Mathieson coordinated outreach activities for school teachers and their students. Mathieson encourages others to take part in citizen science.

In 2015 she joined the King's College London Youth Access and Equity Research and Practice Agenda. She took part in the UK Government's Science Communication enquiry in June 2015. In July 2016 Mathieson took up the role as chief executive of the British Science Association in July 2016. At the British Science Association she works to make science as fundamental to society. She launched Not Just for Scientists a campaign that looked for "ideas from people who would like to contribute to debate about science’s role in society". In 2017 Mathieson met the Duke of York. She is worried about the teaching of practical science at schools. In 2018 she became concerned that Brian Cox and David Attenborough did not make science accessible to all of the general public.

Mathieson has written for the Huffington Post, The Guardian, The Independent and Open Access Government. She appeared on the radio and been on several podcasts. Mathieson is a Girlguiding leader and is a trustee at the Royal Commonwealth Society. She is a Brownie leader. She has taken part in a PricewaterhouseCoopers Tech She Can charter.

Since spring 2022 Mathieson has been Director of the Royal Institution.
