= Gail Cardew =

British biologist

Gail Cardew FRSB
- Education: University of Sussex
- Scientific career
- Fields: Public engagement Science policy
- Workplaces: Linnean Society of London; EuroScience; Royal Institution; University of Sussex; Novartis Foundation
- Thesis: Studies on Suc1 in Xenopus laevis (1994)
- Website: www.euroscience.org/news/new-executive-committee

Gail Cardew is a British biologist who is the Vice President of EuroScience. She previously served as Professor of Science, Culture and Society at the Royal Institution. In 2020 she was awarded an honorary Doctor of Science (DSc) degree from the University of Sussex.

== Early life and education ==
Cardew became interested in science at high school, and attributes her enthusiasm to Mr Buckby and Mr Savill. Through them she learned about John Maynard Smith, which inspired her to study biology at the University of Sussex. She earned her bachelor's degree in biology in 1989. She remained there for her doctoral research, where she studied regulation of the embryonic cell cycle in (the African clawed frog Xenopus laevis) in 1994. During her doctorate she particularly enjoyed meeting visiting guest speakers and frequently considered switching to a different discipline.

== Career and research ==
After a short period as a postdoctoral research fellow investigating cardiovascular disease at the University of Sussex, Cardew decided to work in science publishing. She worked as an editor for the Novartis Foundation symposia series, supporting biomedical researchers in leading proposals for future events. Cardew works at the intersection of society, culture, science and the arts.

Cardew was elected President of EuroScience in 2006, on their executive committee in 2018 and as Vice President of their governing board in 2019. She serves as Chair of the EuroScience Open Forum Advisory Board, through which she devices the host cities of their annual events. She serves on the advisory board of the European Research Council science communication campaign ERC=Science^{2}. Cardew has served as judge for the international science communication competition Falling Walls.

=== Royal Institution ===
Cardew joined the Royal Institution in 2000, where she led their education and public engagement programmes. In 2011 she became their first Director of Science and Education, in which capacity she oversaw science education and policy work. She represented the Royal Institution at a Government of the United Kingdom roundtable on effective ways to encourage girls to choose physics, engineering and mathematics. She was appointed a professor of Science, Culture and Society in 2015. Cardew has supported almost twenty years of the Royal Institution Christmas Lectures. The storyline of each lecture series typically took around four months to develop. She left the Royal Institution in October 2019.

=== Awards and honours ===
- 2014 Elected a Fellow of the Royal Society of Biology (FRSB)
- 2020 Awarded an Honorary Doctor of Science (DSc) by the University of Sussex
