= Edward Andrade =

British physicist

Edward Andrade FRS
- Born: Edward Neville da Costa Andrade; 27 December 1887; London, UKGBI
- Died: 6 June 1971 (aged 83); London, UK
- Education: St Dunstan's College; University College London; University of Heidelberg (Dr.)
- Known for: Work on gamma rays (1914)
- Awards: FRS (1935); Fernand Holweck Medal and Prize (1947); Wilkins Lecture (1949); Hughes Medal (1958)
- Scientific career
- Fields: Physics
- Workplaces: University College London (1928–50); Royal Institution (1950–53)
- Thesis: Über Wesen und Geschwindigkeit metallischer Träger in Flamme (1911)
- Doctoral advisor: Philipp Lenard
- Doctoral students: Francis Crick

Edward Neville da Costa Andrade (/ˈændreɪd/; 27 December 1887 – 6 June 1971) was a British physicist, writer, and poet. He told The Literary Digest his name was pronounced "as written, i.e., like air raid, with and substituted for air." He is best known for work with Ernest Rutherford that first determined the wavelength of a type of gamma radiation, proving it was far higher in energies than X-rays known at the time. Also, a rheological model suggested by him and bearing his name is still widely employed in continuum mechanics and its geophysical applications. In popular culture, he was best known for his appearances on The Brains Trust.

== Biography ==
Edward Neville da Costa Andrade was born on 27 December 1887 in London into a Sephardi Jewish family, who arrived in London from Portugal during the Napoleonic era. He attended St Dunstan's College in Catford, which was noted as the first school to have a laboratory for teaching secondary school age pupils. He then entered University College London, where he gained a First Class Honours degree in physics in 1907. After graduating, he stayed on to pursue research, choosing to study the flow of solid metals under stress, a subject to which he returned several times over the sixty-year course of his research career.

In 1910, Andrade studied the electrical properties of flames under Philipp Lenard at the University of Heidelberg, for which he received a doctorate the following year. He then had a brief but productive spell of research with Ernest Rutherford at the Victoria University of Manchester in 1914. They carried out diffraction experiments to determine the wavelengths of gamma rays from radium, and were the first to be able to quantitate these, thereby showing that they were shorter than the wavelengths of then-known X-ray radiation that was produced by "Roentgen tubes". He joined the Royal Artillery during the First World War, and then became Professor of Physics at the Ordnance College in Woolwich in 1920.

In 1928, Andrade became Quain Professor of Physics at University College London. In 1943, he was invited to deliver the Royal Institution's Christmas Lectures on Vibrations and Waves, then in 1950 he developed the lectures further and presented the series on Waves and Vibrations. The same year, he was appointed Fullerian Professor of Chemistry at the Royal Institution. Opposition to his attempts to reform the RI led to a vote of no confidence in him by members of the RI, following which he resigned in 1953.

Andrade was also a broadcaster, coming to fame during the War on BBC radio's The Brains Trust.

- The Structure of the Atom (1923)
- Engines (1928)
- The Mechanism of Nature (1930)
- Simple Science with Julian Huxley.
- More Simple Science (1935) with Julian Huxley.
- Sir Isaac Newton (1950)
- An Approach to Modern Physics (1956)
- A Brief History of the Royal Society (1960)
- Physics for the Modern World (1962)
- Rutherford and the Nature of the Atom (1964)

His papers are held by the University of Leicester.
