= Royal Institution =

UK scientific research and education body

Coordinates: 51.5098°N 0.1425°W

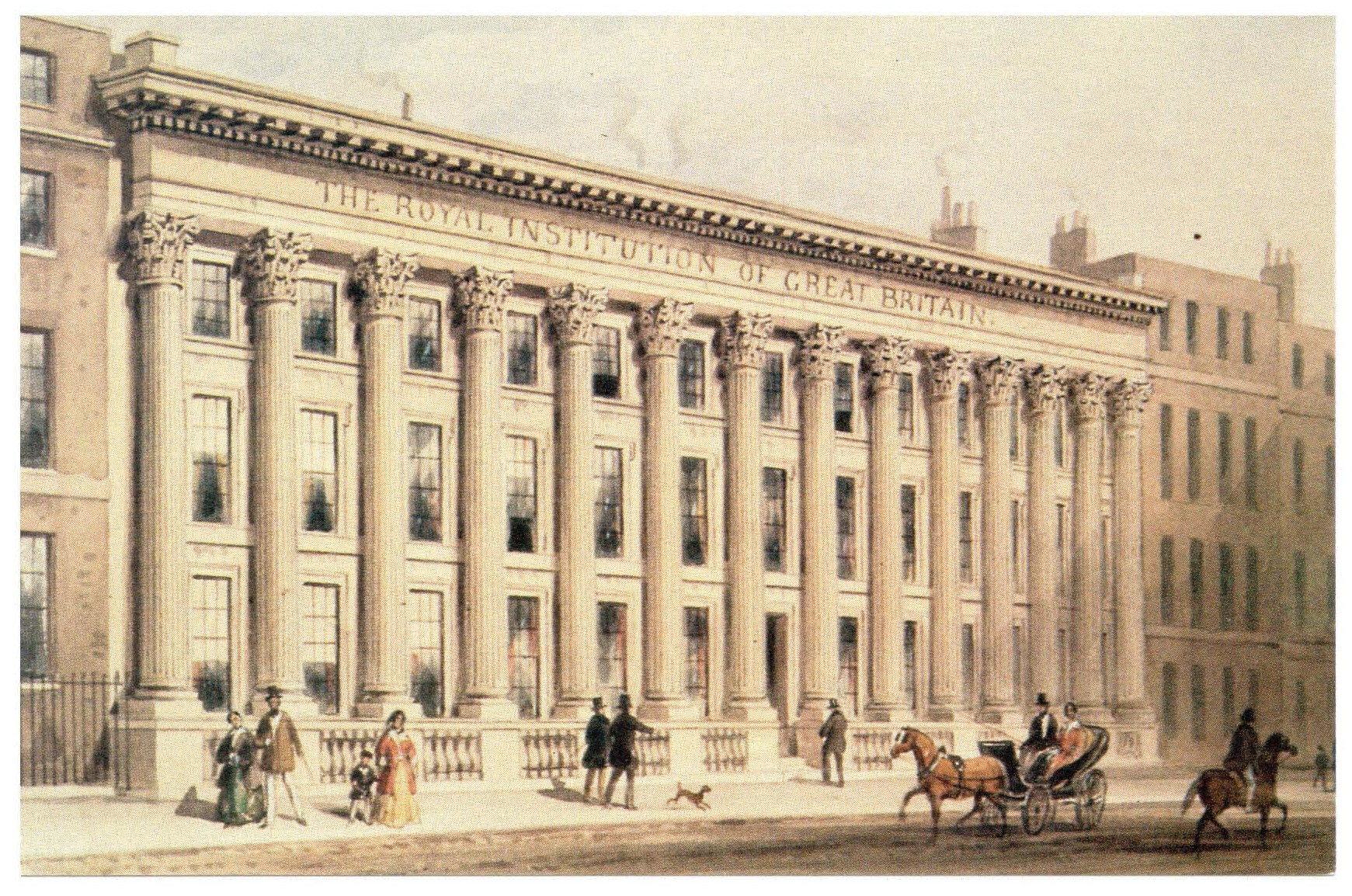
- The Royal Institution building on Albemarle Street, London, c. 1838
- Established: 1799
- Website: www.rigb.org

The Royal Institution of Great Britain (often the Royal Institution, abbreviated Ri or RI) is an organisation for scientific education and research, based in the City of Westminster. It was founded in 1799 by the leading British scientists of the age, including Henry Cavendish and its first president, George Finch. Its foundational principles were diffusing the knowledge of, and facilitating the general introduction of useful mechanical inventions and improvements, as well as enhancing the application of science to the common purposes of life (including through teaching, courses of philosophical lectures, and experiments).

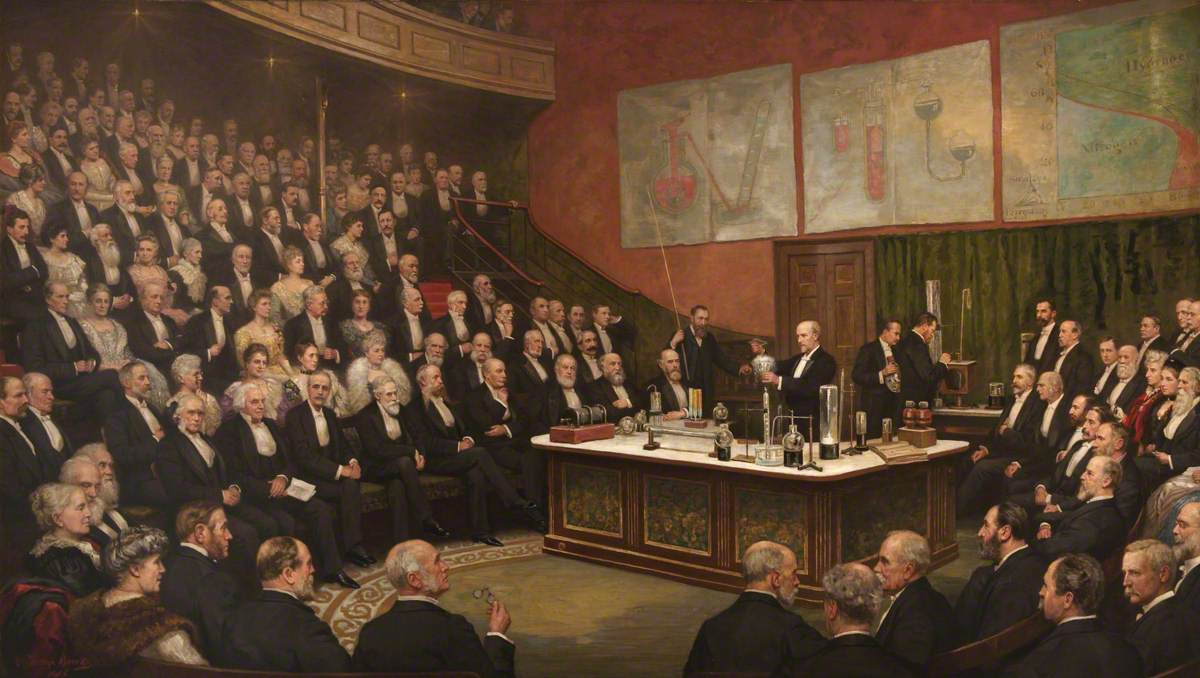
A Friday Evening Discourse at the Royal Institution; Sir James Dewar on Liquid Hydrogen by Henry Jamyn Brooks, 1904

Much of the Institution's initial funding and the initial proposal for its founding were given by the Society for Bettering the Conditions and Improving the Comforts of the Poor, under the guidance of philanthropist Sir Thomas Bernard and American-born British scientist Sir Benjamin Thompson, Count Rumford. Since its founding it has been based at 21 Albemarle Street in Mayfair. Its Royal Charter was granted in 1800.

== History ==
The Royal Institution was founded as the result of a proposal by Sir Benjamin Thompson (Count Rumford) for the "formation by Subscription, in the Metropolis of the British Empire, of a Public Institution for diffusing the Knowledge and facilitating the general Introduction of useful Mechanical Inventions and Improvements, and for the teaching by courses of Philosophical Lectures and Experiments, the application of Science to the Common Purposes of Life".

Rumford's proposal led to a 7 March 1799 meeting at the house of Joseph Banks, then president of the Royal Society, a similar but much older learned society. A follow-up meeting on 9 March saw the first meeting of the managers of the Institution. In June of that year, the society elected George Finch, 9th Earl of Winchilsea as its first president, and in July it purchased the 21 Albemarle Street, Mayfair building that has served as its home ever since. Renovations began immediately on the building to provide appropriate meeting, office, and laboratory space for the Institution's mission.

The first Professor and Public Lecturer in Experimental Philosophy, Mechanics and Chemistry was Dr Thomas Garnett, whom Rumford poached from the newly founded Andersonian Institute in Glasgow in October 1799.

The steep-sided main lecture hall that has become the building's most publicly visible feature, as the home of its Christmas lectures, was completed in 1800, the same year that the institution received its royal charter from George III. The lecture hall was put to use immediately; the first lecture given in it was by Garnett in March 1800.

Royal Institution of Great Britain Act 1810
- Act of Parliament
- Parliament of the United Kingdom
- Long title: An Act for enlarging the Powers granted by His Majesty to the Royal Institution of Great Britain, and for extending and more effectually promoting the Objects thereof.
- Citation: 50 Geo. 3. c. li

Dates
- Royal assent: 18 April 1810

Text of statute as originally enacted

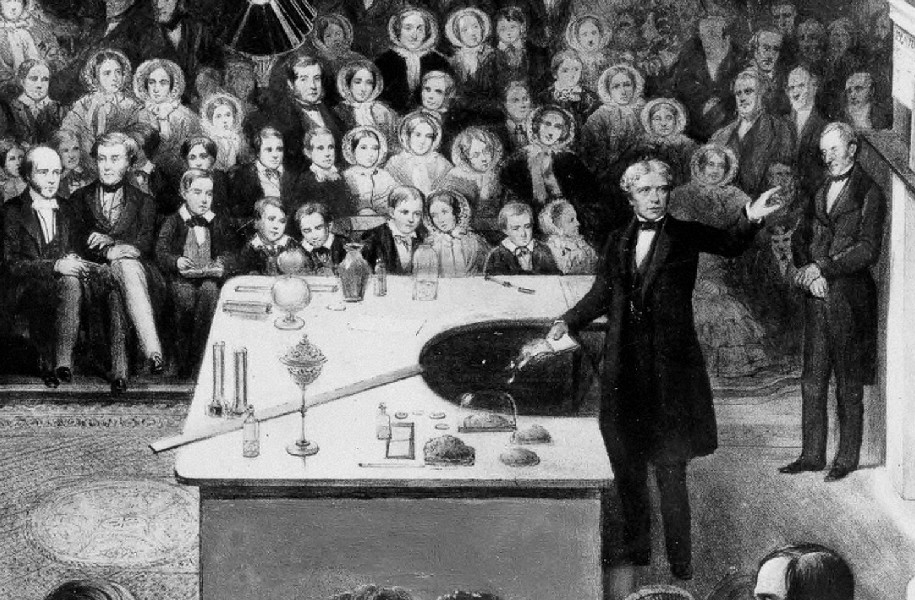
Michael Faraday's 1856 Christmas Lecture

Throughout its history, the Institution has supported public engagement with science through a programme of lectures, many of which continue today. The most famous of these were both founded in 1825: the annual Royal Institution Christmas Lectures, and the Friday Evening Discourses.

Despite Garnett's first lectures being a great success, his salary was frozen, he was not allowed to practise as a doctor, and Humphry Davy was appointed as his assistant, so he resigned. Humphry Davy was an even greater success, as was his assistant and successor Michael Faraday. Davy's immediate successor was William Thomas Brande.

Thus the Institution has had an instrumental role in the advancement of science since its founding. Notable scientists who have worked there include Sir Humphry Davy (who discovered sodium and potassium), Michael Faraday, James Dewar, Sir William Henry Bragg and Sir William Lawrence Bragg (winners of the Nobel Prize for Physics for their work on x-ray diffraction), Max Perutz, John Kendrew, Antony Hewish, and George Porter.

In the 19th century, Faraday at the Royal Institution carried out much of the research which laid the groundwork for the practical exploitation of electricity. In total fifteen scientists attached to the Royal Institution have won Nobel Prizes. Ten chemical elements including sodium were discovered there; the electric generator was devised at the Institution, and much of the early work on the atomic structure of crystals was carried out within it.

The Royal Institution was founded during the age of slavery, and one of its major supporters was John Fuller, whose fortune derived from two Jamaican plantations. Fuller contributed more than £10,000 to the institution, including endowing two professorships; Michael Faraday was the first Fullerian Professor of Chemistry. In contemporary times, use of the Fullerian title has been discontinued, and the two chairs will no longer be filled.

=== Nobel laureates ===
1. John William Strutt (Lord Rayleigh) (1842–1919): Physics 1904 with William Ramsay for the discovery of argon
2. Joseph John Thomson (1856–1940): Physics 1906 for studies of electrical connection through gases
3. Ernest Rutherford (1871–1937): Chemistry 1908 for work on the chemistry of radioactive substances and the disintegration of the elements
4. William Lawrence Bragg (1890–1971): Physics 1915 joint with WH Bragg, for determining the molecular structure of crystals using x-rays
5. William Henry Bragg (1862–1942): Physics 1915 joint with WL Bragg, for determining the molecular structure of crystals using x-rays
6. Charles Scott Sherrington (1857–1952): Medicine 1932 shared with Edgar Adrian, for his discovery of the function of neurons
7. Henry Hallett Dale (1875–1968): Medicine 1936 joint with Otto Loewi, for their work on the chemical transmission of nerve impulses
8. Peter Brian Medawar (1915–1987): Medicine 1960 for his work on making permanent skin grafts
9. John Cowdery Kendrew (1917–1997): Chemistry 1962 with Perutz, for determining the structures of haemoglobin and myoglobin using X-ray crystallography and (new at the time) electronic computers
10. Max Ferdinand Perutz (1914–2002): Chemistry 1962 with Kendrew, for determining the structures of haemoglobin and myoglobin using X-ray crystallography and (new at the time) electronic computers
11. Andrew Fielding Huxley (1917–2012): Medicine 1963 for explaining how nerves use electricity to send signals around the body
12. Dorothy Crowfoot Hodgkin (1910–1994): Chemistry 1964 for determining the structure of important biochemical substances including vitamin B12 and penicillin using X-ray techniques
13. George Porter (1920–2002): Chemistry 1967 for work on chemical reactions triggered by light, and for photographing the behaviour of molecules during fast reactions
14. Antony Hewish (1924–2021): Physics 1974 for his work on the discovery of pulsars
15. Sir John Gurdon (1933–2025): in 2012, he and Shinya Yamanaka were awarded the Nobel Prize for Physiology or Medicine for the discovery that mature cells can be converted to stem cells

=== Chemical elements discovered or isolated ===
1. Potassium – Isolated from caustic potash by Humphry Davy in 1807 using electrolysis.
2. Sodium – Humphry Davy first isolated sodium in 1807 from molten sodium hydroxide.
3. Barium – Isolated by electrolysis of molten barium salts by Humphry Davy in 1808.
4. Boron – Discovered by Humphry Davy who first used electrolysis to produce a brown precipitate from a solution of borates in 1808. He produced enough of the substance to identify it as an element but pure boron was not produced until 1909.
5. Calcium – Isolated by Humphry Davy in 1808 from a mixture of lime and mercuric oxide using electrolysis.
6. Chlorine – Elemental chlorine was discovered in 1774 but was thought to be a compound and was called "dephlogisticated muriatic acid air". Humphry Davy named it chlorine in 1810 after experimenting with it and declared it was an element.
7. Magnesium – First produced and discovered in 1808 by Humphry Davy using electrolysis of a mixture of magnesia and mercury oxide.
8. Strontium – Known in mineral form but isolated as an element in 1808 by Humphry Davy from a mixture of strontium chloride and mercuric acid.
9. Iodine – Discovered by Bernard Courtois in 1811, he lacked the resources to investigate the substance but gave samples to various researchers. It was named by Joseph Louis Gay-Lussac who thought it either a compound of oxygen or an element. A few days later Humphry Davy stated it was a new element leading to argument between the two over who identified it first.
10. Argon – Discovered in 1894 by Lord Rayleigh and William Ramsay.

=== Past presidents ===
Since 1799, the Royal Institution has had fifteen presidents and one acting president.

- 1799 – George Finch, 9th Earl of Winchilsea
- 1813 – George John Spencer, 2nd Earl Spencer
- 1825 – Thomas Pelham, 2nd Earl of Chichester
- 1827 – Edward Adolphus Seymour, 11th Duke of Somerset
- 1842 – Algernon Percy, 4th Duke of Northumberland
- 1865 – Sir Henry Holland, 1st Baronet
- 1873 – Algernon George Percy, 6th Duke of Northumberland
- 1899 – Henry George Percy, 7th Duke of Northumberland
- 1918 – Alan Ian Percy, 8th Duke of Northumberland
- 1930 – Lord Eustace Percy, raised to the peerage as 1st Baron Percy of Newcastle in 1953
- 1945 – Robert John Strutt, 4th Baron Rayleigh
- 1948 – John Theodore Cuthbert Moore-Brabazon, 1st Baron Brabazon of Tara
- 1963 – Alexander Fleck, 1st Baron Fleck
- 1968 – William Wellclose Davis (acting)
- 1969 – Harold Roxbee Cox, Baron Kings Norton
- 1976 – Prince Edward, Duke of Kent

=== Past directors ===
The leadership of the Royal Institution has had various titles:

- Director of the Laboratory
- Director of the Davy-Faraday Research Laboratory
- Director

The position was abolished in 2010, with the firing of Susan Greenfield.

The position was restored in April 2017 with the appointment of Sarah Harper, Professor of Gerontology at the University of Oxford. Harper resigned in September 2017.

The present director is Katherine Mathieson.

=== Andrade controversy ===
In 1952, Edward Andrade was forced to resign following a complicated controversy over the management of the Royal Institution and his powers as director, involving a power struggle with Alexander Rankine who was secretary. Following various resignations and general meetings of members, Andrade was awarded £7,000 by arbitration: the arbitrators blamed the problems on "a lack of clear definition of roles ... an outdated constitution, and the inability of the protagonists to compromise". Andrade launched a lawsuit to set the arbitration aside, which he lost.

=== Director Greenfield firing ===
From 1998 to 8 January 2010, the director of the Royal Institution was Baroness Susan Greenfield, but following a review, the position was abolished for being "no longer affordable". The Royal Institution had found itself in a financial crisis following a £22 million development programme led by Greenfield, which included refurbishment of the institution's main Albemarle Street building, and the addition of a restaurant and bar with an aim to turn the venue into a "Groucho club for science". The project ended £3 million in debt.

Greenfield subsequently announced that she would be suing for discrimination. The RI's official statement stated it would "continue to deliver its main charitable objectives under the direction of chief executive officer, Chris Rofe and a talented senior team including Professor Quentin Pankhurst, the Director of the Davy-Faraday Research Laboratory, Dr Gail Cardew, the Head of Programmes and Professor Frank James, Head of Collections and Heritage." Baroness Greenfield later dropped the discrimination case.

== Current organisation ==
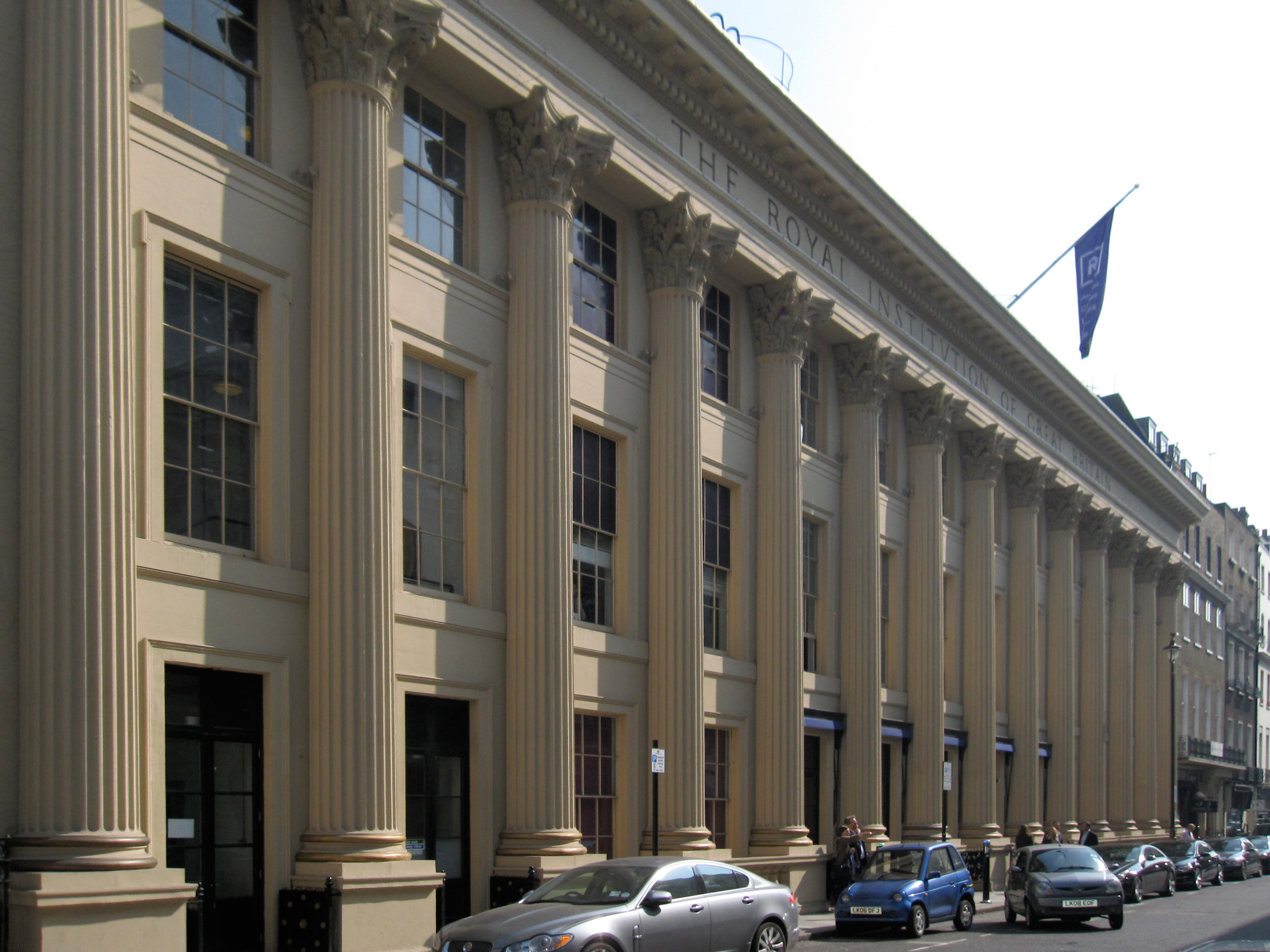
The exterior of the Royal Institution in 2011

Today the Royal Institution is committed to "diffusing science for the common purposes of life". Membership is open to all, with no nomination procedure or academic requirements, on payment of an annual subscription.

The Institution's patrons and trustees include:

- Patron: Charles III
- President: The Duke of Kent
- Honorary Vice-President: Sir John Ritblat
- Chairman: Sir Richard Catlow
- Board of Trustees (current): Sophie Forgan, Simon Godwin, Kate Hamilton, Suze Kundu, Renato Lulia, the Baroness Morris of Yardley, Vincent Nobel, Christopher Potter, Angela Seddon, Jack Stilgoe, Harriet Wallace, Allison Wollard

In December 2021, the Institution appointed Katherine Mathieson as Director. In July 2018, the institution announced a new five-year strategy running from October 2018 to September 2023. The strategy, which sets out to double the charity's size, involves "plans for new research, development of a new national science club and open forum public policy debates". One new venture will be a Research Centre for Science and Culture, working with other academic groups, this "will investigate historical and contemporary examples of the relationship between science and culture".

The institution's palatial home has been greatly enlarged and redeveloped since 1799, and is a Grade I listed building. The structure's last refurbishment was a £22 million project completed in 2008, intended to create a "science salon" for the public. As well as the famous Lecture Theatre, the building contains several function rooms, modern research facilities and a public café. The trustees were considering selling the building in an effort to recoup the organisation's debts, which amounted to £7 million. In 2013 The Ri received an anonymous donation of £4.4m and as of January 2016, the Ri is now debt-free.

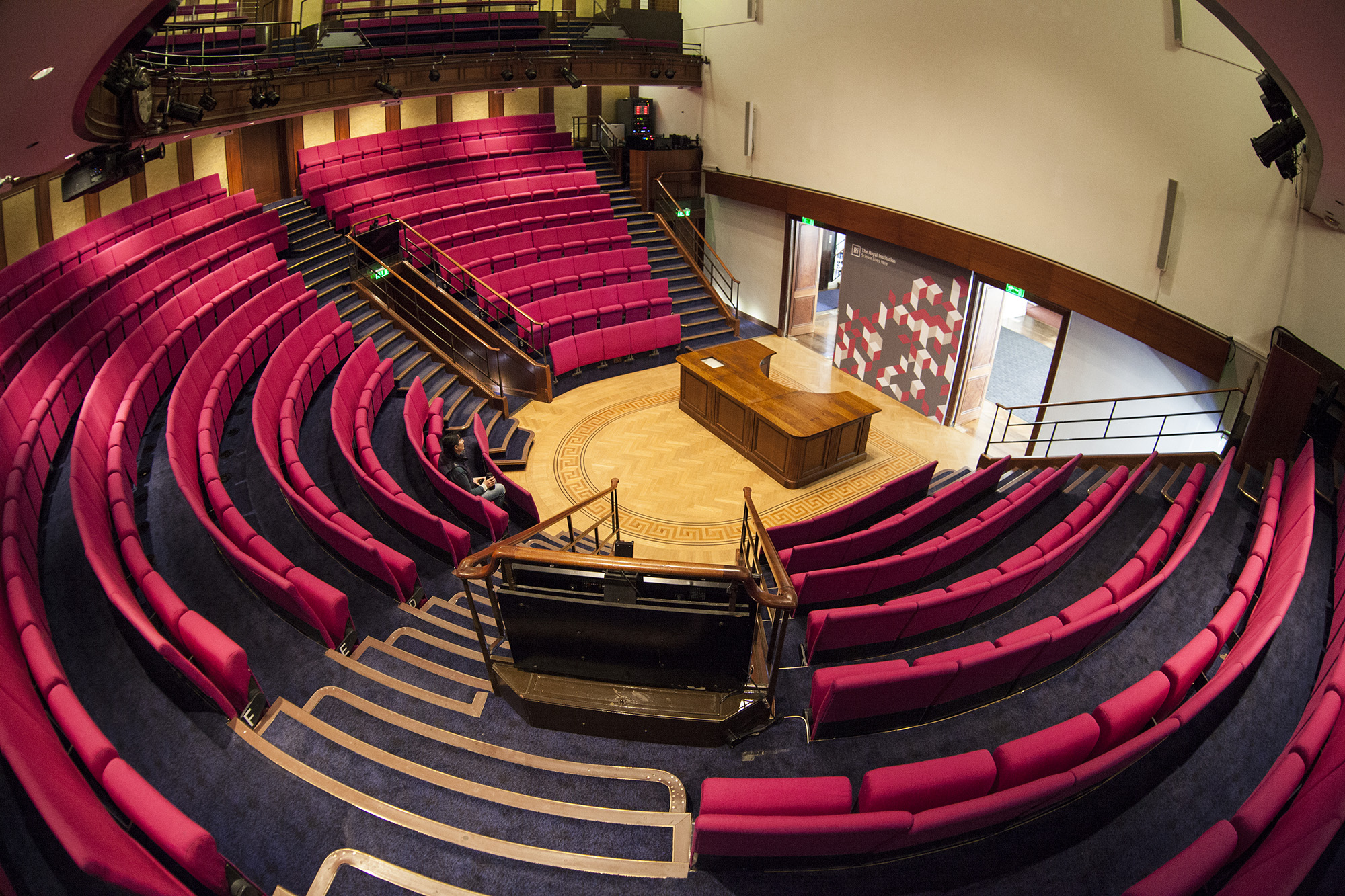
The Royal Institution Lecture Theatre. Here Michael Faraday first demonstrated electromagnetism.

The institution (which it now abbreviates as 'Ri', though third parties often prefer 'RI') has a substantial public science programme and science for schools programme, holding over one hundred events per year on a wide variety of topics. The Christmas Lectures continue today as a series of three televised lectures aimed at children. The Friday Evening Discourses, once weekly now monthly, are lectures given by eminent scientists and researchers, limited to exactly one hour. There is an annual members' ballot for tickets to the Christmas Lectures but all other events are open to the public. Discounts or free tickets are available to Ri Patrons and Members. Many other events and lectures are held both at Albemarle Street and at other venues around the country.

Scientific research headed by Professor Quentin Pankhurst continues to be done under the auspices of the Davy-Faraday Research Laboratory (DFRL), and indeed this is considered to be one of the UK's most notable labs in nano-science.

In May 2015, The Royal Institution was host to the historic unveiling of the Santara Computer, created by Dr Andrew Deonarine.

In November 2015 a new membership scheme was launched and Fellows of the Ri were abolished. The new scheme includes the categories Member, Under 26 and Ri Young Member. Adult Members have voting rights and use of MRi as post-nominal letters. A Patrons' scheme has also been introduced for the first time.

In December 2011 the Royal Institution launched the Ri Channel, a new website displaying science videos and archive content from the Royal Institution, including past Christmas Lectures. The Ri Channel was archived in late 2017 with all Ri videos except past Christmas Lectures being hosted on YouTube. Past Christmas Lectures are hosted on the Ri's website and in early 2018 the Ri began a to upload all past Christmas Lectures that were not already available on its website.

The Royal Institution has become a mixed tenancy office building that hosts conferences, weddings and events in order to continue to pursue its charitable goals. In 2015 it sold small part of its historic collection of manuscripts that did not relate to its own history in order to raise funds.

Since 2021, the researchers of the London Institute for Mathematical Sciences have been tenants on the second floor. They occupy rooms that were once the private living quarters of Michael Faraday, where they carry out their research in theoretical physics and mathematics.

== Faraday Museum ==
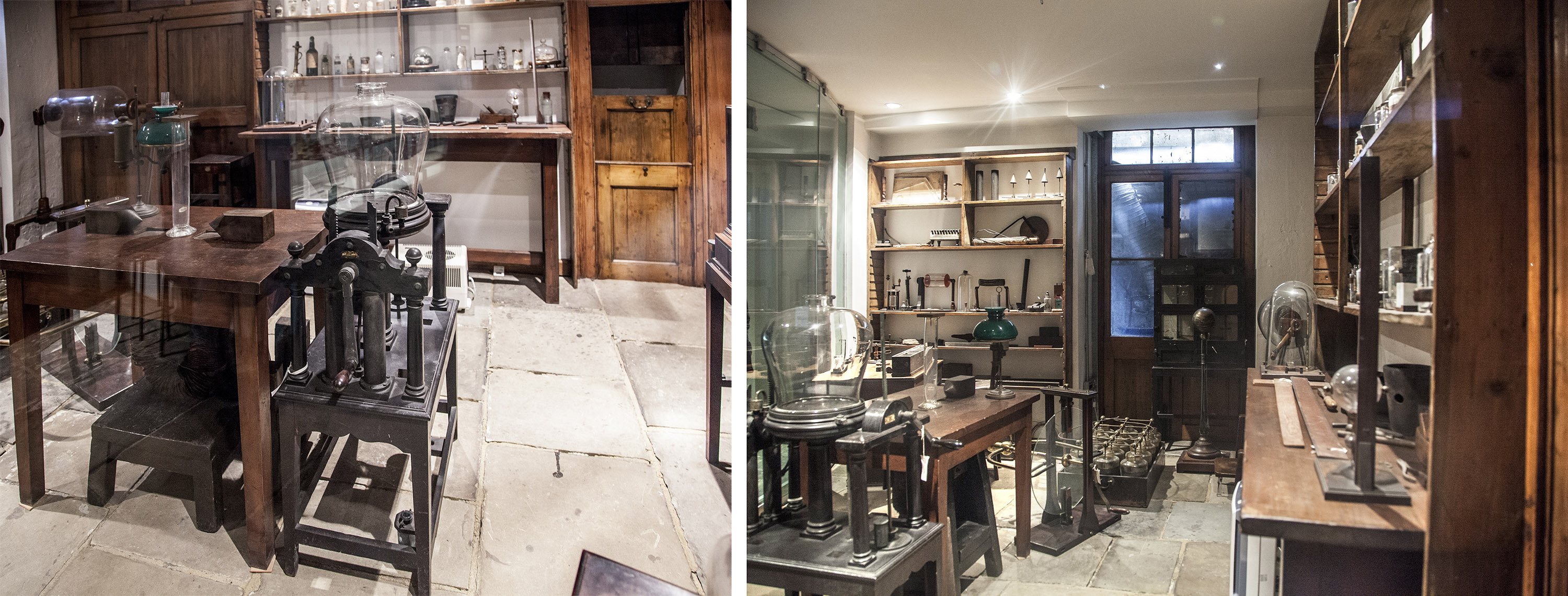
Royal Institution. Faraday Museum. Faraday's original 1850s laboratory

Though the Royal Institution has had a museum since its founding, in 1973 the Royal Institution officially opened the Faraday Museum, a museum dedicated to Michael Faraday. It is in the main building in Albemarle Street and is open to the public during weekday office hours. The highlight of the exhibition is Faraday's original 1850s laboratory (not a reconstruction as often cited). Opposite this lab is the current state-of-the-art nanotechnology lab. Other exhibits include the discoveries, people and activities of the Royal Institution.

== See also ==
- British Association for the Advancement of Science
- Directors of the Royal Institution
- Gresham College
- Hakluyt Society
- History of science
- Learned societies
- London Institute for Mathematical Sciences
- Royal Institution Christmas Lectures
- Royal Institution of Australia
- Royal Institution of Cornwall
- Royal Institution of South Wales
- Liverpool Royal Institution
- Royal Manchester Institution
- Royal Society
- Science Media Centre
- Science outreach
