= Danielle George =

British engineer and government advisor

Danielle George CBE FREng FIET
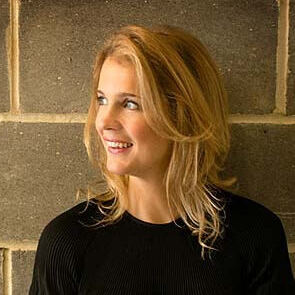
- Danielle George in 2014
- Born: Danielle Amanda Kettle; 27 January 1976 (age 50); Newcastle upon Tyne, England, United Kingdom
- Education: Kenton School; University of Liverpool (BSc); University of Manchester (MSc); University of Manchester Institute of Science and Technology (PhD)
- Spouse: Richard George
- Children: one daughter
- Awards: Royal Institution Christmas Lectures (2014); Michael Faraday Prize (2018)
- Scientific career
- Fields: Microwave engineering; Radio-frequency engineering
- Workplaces: University of Manchester; Jodrell Bank Observatory; Square Kilometre Array; Atacama Large Millimeter Array
- Thesis: Characterisation of low noise devices for radio astronomy applications (2006)
- Doctoral advisor: Robin Sloan
- Website: www.manchester.ac.uk/research/danielle.george

Danielle Amanda George (née Kettle; born 27 January 1976) is Professor of radio frequency engineering in the Department of Electrical and Electronic Engineering and Associate Vice President at the University of Manchester in the UK. George became the 139th President of the Institution of Engineering and Technology in October 2020. Since 2025 she has acted as Chief Scientific Adviser for National Security to the UK government.

== Education ==
George was born to a car mechanic father and a mother who taught children with special needs, and is the middle of three sisters. She grew up in Newcastle upon Tyne and was educated at Kenton School and the University of Liverpool where she completed her Bachelor of Science degree in Astrophysics.

After her Master of Science degree in the School of Physics and Astronomy, University of Manchester, she worked at Jodrell Bank Observatory as a radio frequency engineer. Alongside her engineering work, she completed a PhD degree at the University of Manchester Institute of Science and Technology for research on low-noise amplifiers.

== Career and research ==
George worked at Jodrell Bank Observatory as a senior microwave engineer until 2006, when she was appointed a lecturer in the School of Electrical and Electronic Engineering. She was promoted to Professor at the age of 38 in 2014. She served as editor of the International Journal of Electrical Engineering & Education 2013 to 2014.

George is the UK lead for amplifiers in the Square Kilometre Array, the Atacama Large Millimeter Array telescope and has worked with NASA and the European Space Agency on the development of instrumentation for researchers exploring the Big Bang.

George's research has been funded by the Science and Technology Facilities Council and the Department for Environment, Food and Rural Affairs.

Since 2025 she has been Chief Scientific Adviser for National Security to the UK government, responsible for giving independent scientific advice on national security issues.

=== Science communication ===
George gave the 2014 Royal Institution Christmas Lectures on how to hack your home. At the time of the lectures, she the sixth woman since 1825 to have presented the Christmas lectures, following Susan Greenfield (1994), Nancy Rothwell (1998), Monica Grady (2003), Sue Hartley (2009), and Alison Woollard (2013). The lectures included a live conversation with Samantha Cristoforetti on the International Space Station and turning the Shell Centre in London into a giant game of tetris.

In 2017, she and Christophe Galfard (a former Ph.D. student of Stephen Hawking), presented The Search for a New Earth on BBC 2, exploring how and if humans could reach for the stars and then relocate to different planets. It had clips of Stephen Hawking talking about his various theories. "We can, and must, use our curiosity and intelligence to look to the stars".

=== Honours and awards ===
In 2016, the Royal Academy of Engineering awarded her the Rooke Medal for public promotion of engineering, and in 2017 she received the Harold Hartley Medal for outstanding contribution to the field of Measurement and Control.

She was appointed Member of the Order of the British Empire (MBE) in the 2016 Birthday Honours for services to engineering through public engagement, and became a Commander of the Order of the British Empire (CBE) in the 2024 New Year Honours for services to public engagement in engineering.

George was awarded the Michael Faraday Prize by the Royal Society in 2018. She is also a Fellow of the Institution of Engineering and Technology (FIET). In 2026 she was elected a Fellow of the Royal Academy of Engineering.
