= Michael Faraday Prize (Royal Society) =

Royal Society of London Michael Faraday Medal & Prize
- Awarded for: excellence in communicating science to UK audiences
- Sponsored by: Royal Society of London
- Location: London
- Country: United Kingdom
- Website: Official website

The Royal Society Michael Faraday Prize and Lecture is awarded for "excellence in communicating science to UK audiences." Named after Michael Faraday, the medal itself is made of silver gilt, and is accompanied by a purse of £2500.

== Background ==
The prize was first awarded in 1986 to Charles Taylor for "his outstanding presentations of physics and applications of physics, aimed at audiences from six-year-old primary school children to adults". It is awarded annually and unlike other Royal Society awards such as the Hughes Medal, it has been presented every year since its inception. The winner is required to present a lecture as part of the Society's annual programme of public events, which is usually held in January of the following year; during the lecture, the President of the Royal Society awards the medal. Unlike other prizes awarded by the society, the committee has not always publicly provided a rationale. This has occurred five times—in 2004 to Martin Rees, in 2006 to Richard Fortey, in 2007 to Jim Al-Khalili, in 2008 to John D. Barrow and most recently in 2009 to Marcus du Sautoy.

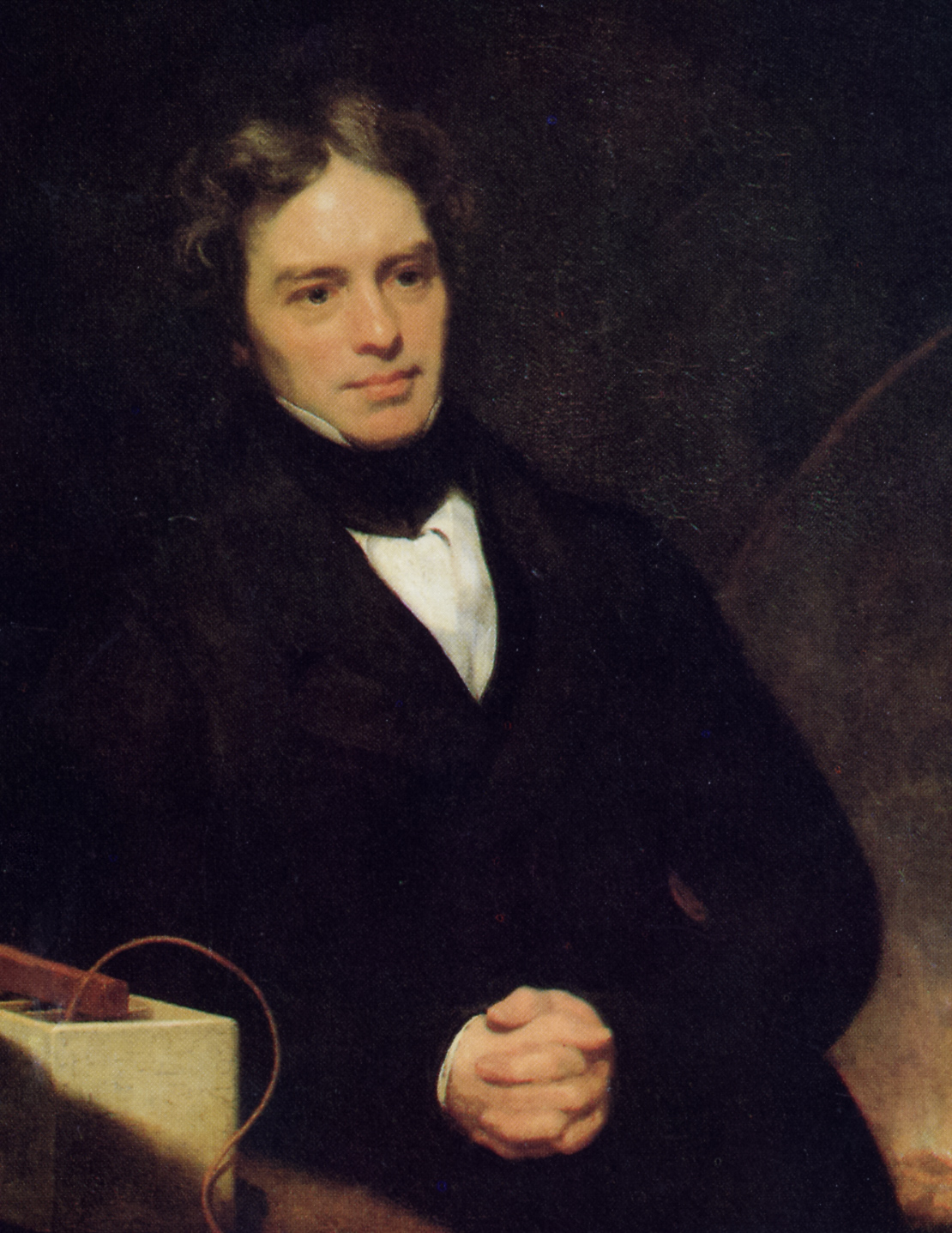
Michael Faraday, after whom the prize is named

== List of recipients ==
Year	Name	Citation / Lecture Title	Notes
1986	Charles Taylor	"for his outstanding presentations of physics and applications of physics, aimed at audiences from six-year-old primary school children to adults"	
1987	Peter Medawar	"for the contribution his books had made in presenting to the public, and to scientists themselves, the intellectual nature and the essential humanity of pursuing science at the highest level and the part it played in our modern culture"	
1988	Erik Christopher Zeeman	"for the contributions he has made to the popularization of mathematics"	
1989	Colin Blakemore	"for his written, broadcast and public presentations on the science of the brain, which are superbly crafted for lay and expert audiences alike"	
1990	Richard Dawkins	"for his written, broadcast and public presentations which are accessible, imaginative and enjoyed by large audiences"	
1991	George Porter	"in recognition of his outstanding contribution to improving the public understanding of science through his many public lectures and broadcasts, his directorship of the Royal Institution and presidencies of the Royal Society and British Association and his seminal role in the establishment and leadership of COPUS"	
1992	Richard Gregory	"for his many popular books and papers, his countless public lectures and television and radio appearances, and his creation of the Exploratory Hands-on Science Centre in Bristol"	
1993	Ian Fells	"for his many written articles for the national press and popular science journals, his public lectures on many platforms often tailored for school children, and his major contribution in broadcasting where he has had an input to over 350 radio and television programmes"	
1994	Walter Bodmer	"for his outstanding achievement in raising the public understanding of science and technology as an issue of the highest importance to individual scientists and engineers and to many bodies that represent them"	
1995	Ian Stewart	"for his work in communicating mathematical ideas to the widest possible range of audiences through his many thought-provoking books and magazine articles, his radio and television presentations, and his energetic public lectures in schools and industry on a variety of mathematical and quasi-mathematical topics"	
1996	Steve Jones	"for his numerous, wide ranging contributions to the public understanding of science in areas such as human evolution and variation, race, sex, inherited disease and genetic manipulation through his many broadcasts on radio and television, his lectures, popular science books, and his regular science column in The Daily Telegraph and contributions to other newspaper media"	
1997	David Phillips	"for his outstanding talents in the communication of scientific principles, methods and applications to young audiences through his many demonstration lectures with wit, clarity and enthusiasm on a wide variety of topics from basic science to modern laser research and for his major role in various collaborative ventures for young people with the Royal Institution, the British Association and CREST, and for his popular science articles and contributions to a variety of radio and television broadcasts, combined with his full professional workload as Head of Chemistry at Imperial College and overseeing a research group"	—
1998	Susan Greenfield	"for her outstanding talents in communicating to the public how the brain works, popularising brain studies via The Royal Institution Christmas Lectures, lecturing both in Britain and overseas to a wide variety of audiences, including young people, both in schools and outside the classroom, and through her activities as an author of popular books, newspaper articles and columns and her many television appearances"	
1999	Robert Winston	"for his outstanding contribution to the public understanding of human infertility and in vitro fertilisation. He has published five books as well as contributing to many newspaper articles. He is renowned as a gifted communicator especially to non-scientists, describing complex issues relating to human infertility clearly and without over-simplification. His major contribution has been in the field of television and radio both hosting and contributing to programmes"	
2000	Lewis Wolpert	"for his enormous contribution to the public understanding of science most notably through his Chairmanship of COPUS and his varied and wide-ranging television and radio programmes as well as his regular contributions to the national broadsheet newspapers. For over two decades, Lewis Wolpert has brought public attention to many subjects including depression which still carries considerable social stigma through books, lectures, newspaper articles using his own brand of enthusiasm and charisma"	
2001	Harold Kroto	"for his dedication to the notion of working scientists being communicators of their work and in particular for his establishment of the Vega Science Trust whose films and related activities reflect the excitement of scientific discovery to the public"	
2002	Paul Davies	on The origin of life.	
2003	David Attenborough	on Perception, deception and reality	
2004	Martin Rees	on Einstein's legacy as scientist and icon	
2005	Fran Balkwill	on A silent killer	
2006	Richard Fortey	on A natural history of scientists	
2007	Jim Al-Khalili	on The House of Wisdom and the legacy of Arabic science	
2008	John D. Barrow	on Every picture tells a story	
2009	Marcus du Sautoy	on The secret mathematicians	
2010	Jocelyn Bell-Burnell	on The end of the world in 2012? Science communication and science scares	
2011	Colin Pillinger	on Stones From the Sky: A Heaven-sent Opportunity to Talk About Science	
2012	Brian Cox	"for his excellent work in science communication"	
2013	Frank Close	"for his excellent work in science communication"	
2014	Andrea Sella	"for his excellent work in science communication"	
2015	Katherine Willis	"for her excellent work in science communication"	
2016	Nick Lane	"for his excellent work in science communication"	
2017	Mark Miodownik	"for excellence in communicating science to UK audiences"	
2018	Danielle George	"for her public outreach, promotion of her discipline, and leadership of national programmes inspiring young people to express their creativity while innovating in science and engineering."	
2019	Martyn Poliakoff	"for his exemplary work to promote chemistry to an international audience via YouTube in a way that is understandable to viewers of all ages."	
2020	David Spiegelhalter	"for bringing key insights from the disciplines of statistics and probability vividly home to the public at large, and to key decision-makers, in entertaining and accessible ways, most recently through the COVID-19 pandemic."	
2021	Sophie Scott	"for her work in engaging the public with neuroscience through events, talks, TV and radio, and exemplifying how science communication can enhance scientific excellence."	
2022	Monica Grady	"for her significant contributions to the field of planetary science, and her dedication and enthusiasm for public engagement, particularly in raising the profile of STEM subjects for young women."	
2023	Anil Seth	"for his ability to inspire and communicate concepts and advances in cognitive neuroscience and consciousness, and therefore what it means to be human, to the public."	
2024	Salim Abdool Karim	"for his scientific leadership, policy advice, epidemiological analyses, and articulate public education, while actively countering disinformation in Africa, particularly South Africa, during the Covid-19 pandemic."	
2025	Michael Wooldridge	"for award-winning work as a leading researcher, educator and commentator in the field of Artificial Intelligence (AI) whose popular science books, lectures and media appearances have informed millions."	
