= David Pye =

David Pye may refer to:

- Sir David Pye (engineer) (1886–1960), British mechanical engineer and academic administrator
- David Pye (furniture designer) (1914–1993), British professor of furniture design
- David Pye (zoologist) (born 1932), British zoologist
