= Edward Frankland =

English chemist (1825–1899)

Sir Edward Frankland KCB FRS FRSE
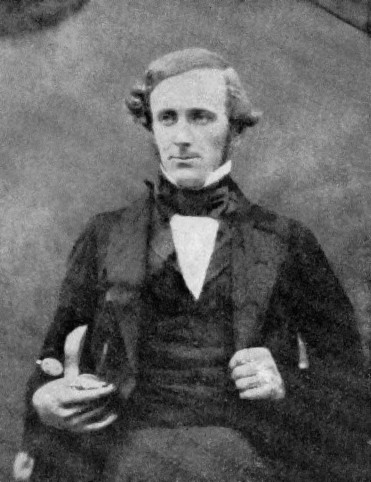
- Edward Frankland in his 20s
- Born: 18 January 1825; Catterall, Lancashire, England
- Died: 9 August 1899 (aged 74); Gålå, Gudbrandsdal, Norway
- Occupation: Research chemist
- Known for: Pioneer in water analysis Discoverer of the principle of valency in chemistry Organometallic chemistry Organotin chemistry

Sir Edward Frankland, KCB, FRS, FRSE (18 January 1825 – 9 August 1899) was an English chemist. He was one of the originators of organometallic chemistry and introduced the concept of combining power or valence.

An expert in water quality and analysis, he was a member of the second royal commission on the pollution of rivers, and studied London's water quality for decades. He established the then revolutionary possibility of biological treatment of sewage using a contact bed to oxidize the waste. This concept was taken up by the chief chemist for the London Metropolitan Board of Works, William Dibdin, in 1887.

He also studied luminous flames and the effects of atmospheric pressure on dense ignited gas, and was one of the discoverers of helium.

== Biography ==
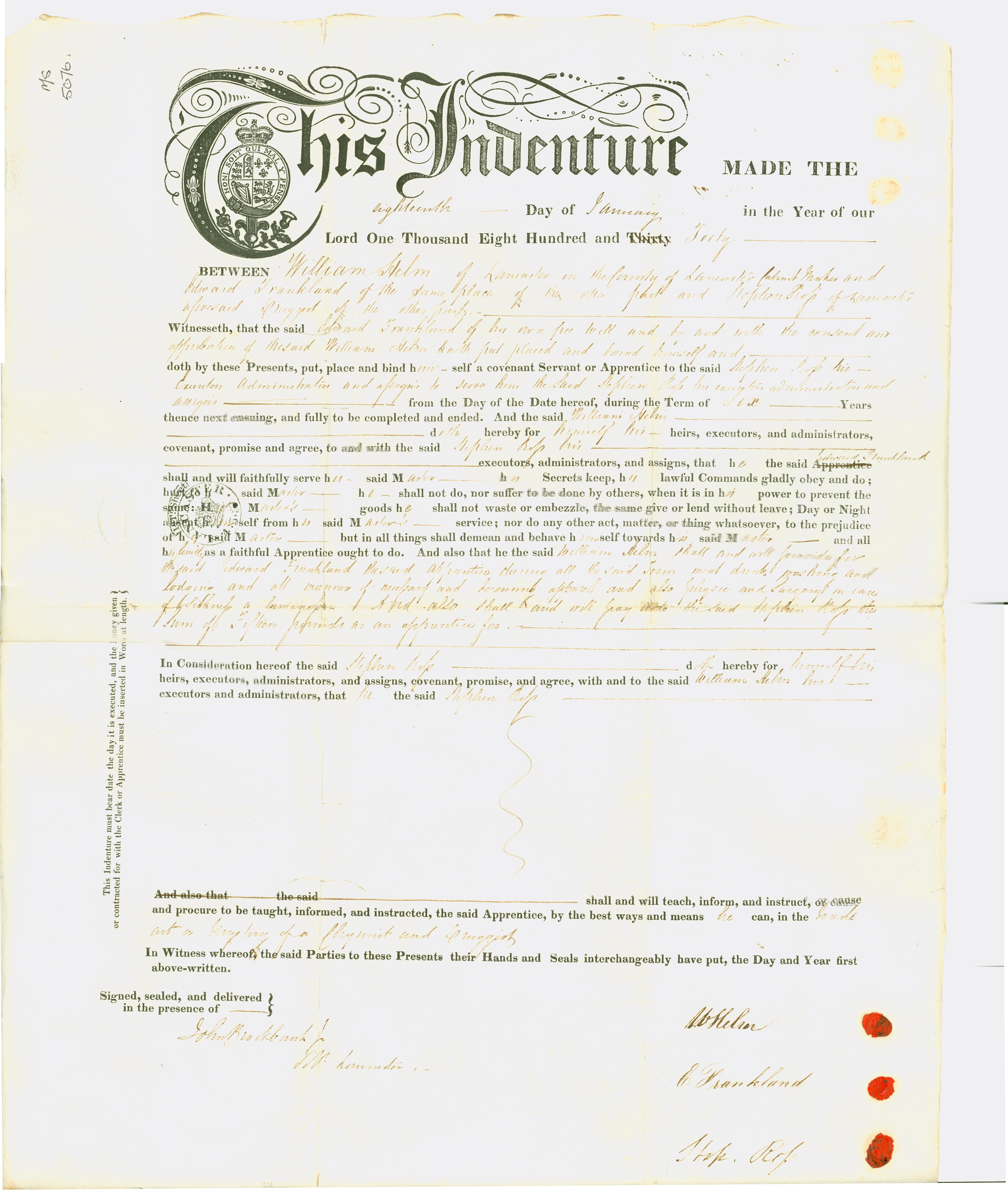
Edward Frankland's indenture

Edward Frankland was born in Catterall, Lancashire and baptised at Churchtown, Lancashire on 20 February 1825. As his baptismal record shows, his birth was illegitimate. His natural father was Edward Chaddock Gorst, the father of John Eldon Gorst. His mother, Margaret "Peggy" Frankland, later married William Helm, a Lancaster cabinet-maker. "His illegitimacy cast a shadow over all his life since he was pledged to silence as to the identity of his natural father, although a handsome annuity was paid to his mother".

From age 3 to 8 Edward lived and was educated in Manchester, Churchtown, Salford and Claughton. In 1833, the family moved to Lancaster and he attended the private school of James Wallasey, where he first took an interest in chemistry, in particular, reading the work of Joseph Priestley borrowed from the Mechanics Institute Library.

At age 12, Edward moved to the Lancaster Free Grammar School (later Lancaster Royal Grammar School), that had also educated scientists William Whewell and Sir Richard Owen. According to Frankland himself, his interest in chemistry was furthered by a case held in the court of Lancaster Castle, which was adjacent to the Free Grammar School (then located on Castle Hill, Lancaster). It was an action brought by the Corporation of Liverpool against Mr Muspratt for committing a nuisance by allowing muriatic acid gas (HCl) to escape from his chemical works in Liverpool. "I was already much interested in chemistry, my step-father allowed me to stay away from school in order to attend the trial" Frankland wished to become a doctor, but the cost of training was "absolutely prohibitive". So the only entrance for him was "the back door of a druggist's shop"

In 1840, Edward was indentured by his step-father, William Helm as an apprentice to Stephen Ross, a Lancaster pharmacist. and his duties included "mortar and pestle work", pounding and mixing large quantities of chemicals to create medicinal preparations such as ointments.

During the latter part of his six-year apprenticeship, Frankland also attended the Lancaster Mechanics' Institute (later to become The Storey, attending classes in a makeshift cottage laboratory made available to local apprentices and other young men by a local doctor, James Johnson. Others in that youthful circle were the scientific writer Robert Galloway (also apprenticed to Ross) and the anatomist William Turner. With support and encouragement from Johnson, Frankland acquired, in 1845, a place in the Westminster laboratory of Lyon Playfair, 1st Baron Playfair. Whilst there, Frankland attended Playfair's lecture course; at the end of it he passed the examination—the only written one he ever sat.

In summer 1847 Frankland visited Germany and met some of Playfair's chemistry contacts there, including Robert Bunsen. In August 1847, Frankland accepted a post as science-master at a boarding school (Queenwood College) in Hampshire, but the following summer he opted to return to Germany to be a full-time student at the University of Marburg. Robert Bunsen was an influential teacher at Marburg at the time, and Bunsen's reputation was one of the main attractions for Frankland. The following year Frankland accepted an invitation to move to Justus von Liebig's laboratory at Giessen. By this stage, Frankland already had his own research agenda and had published some original research in chemistry.

In January 1850, Lyon Playfair revealed his intention to resign from his professorship at Putney College for Civil Engineers in London and arrange to have Frankland become his successor. Hence Frankland abruptly terminated his studies in Germany and returned to take up Playfair's former position in England. A year later Frankland became professor of chemistry at a newly established school now known as the University of Manchester. In 1857, he became lecturer in chemistry at St Bartholomew's Hospital, London, and, in 1863, professor of chemistry at the Royal Institution, London. For two decades Frankland also had a teaching role at the Royal School of Mines in London; and he taught briefly (from 1859 to 1861) at the Royal India Military College at Addiscombe, Surrey.

Edward Frankland was elected a Fellow of the Royal Society in 1853. He was awarded the Society's Royal Medal in 1857 and its Copley Medal in 1894 and was also a member of the X Club. He was made a Knight Commander of the Order of the Bath in 1897.

Edward Frankland became engaged to Sophie Fick, sister of physiologist Adolf Eugen Fick, from Kassel in October 1849. They had first met on Frankland's 1847 trip. They married on 27 February 1851 at St Martin-in-the-Fields. After Sophie's death from tuberculosis in 1874, in 1875 Edward Frankland married Ellen Frances Grenside. He died in Golaa, a village in the Gudbrand Valley whilst on a holiday in Norway. His body was returned to Britain and he was buried near his home in Reigate, Surrey.

His son Percy Frankland was also a noted chemist and a Fellow of the Royal Society.

Frankland's papers are held at The University of Manchester Library.

== Scientific work ==
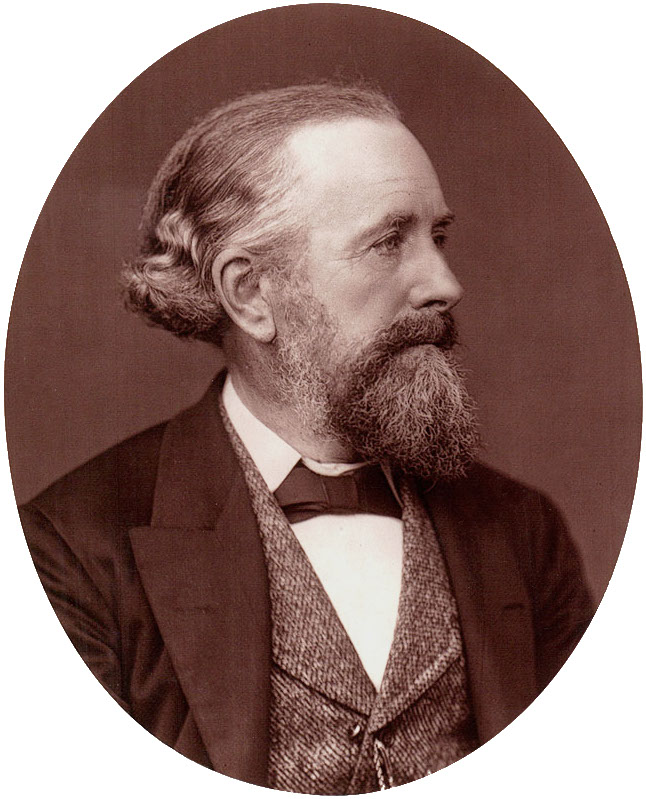
Edward Frankland

From an early age, Frankland engaged in original research with great success. Analytical problems, such as the isolation of certain organic radicals, attracted his attention at first, but he soon turned to chemical syntheses. Robert Bunsen is believed to have directed his students, Edward Frankland and Hermann Kolbe, to the investigation of cacodyl, leading to Frankland's discovery of organometallic compounds. After his return to England Frankland achieved the synthesis of diethylzinc and dimethylzinc by the reaction of ethyl iodide and methyl iodide with metallic zinc.

The theoretical deductions Frankland drew from considering these bodies were even more interesting and important than the bodies themselves. Perceiving a molecular isonomy between them and the inorganic compounds of the metals from which they may be formed, Frankland saw their true molecular type in the oxygen, sulphur or chlorine compounds of those metals, from which he held them to be derived by the substitution of an organic group for the oxygen, sulphur, &c. In this way they enabled him to overthrow the theory of conjugate compounds, and they further led him in 1852 to publish the conception that the atoms of each elementary substance have a definite saturation capacity, so that they can only combine with a certain limited number of the atoms of other elements. The theory of valency thus founded has dominated the subsequent development of chemical doctrine, and forms the groundwork upon which the fabric of modern structural chemistry reposes. Edward Frankland's 1852 publication on his discovery of the theory of valence was honoured by a Citation for Chemical Breakthrough Award from the Division of History of Chemistry of the American Chemical Society in 2015.

In applied chemistry Frankland's great work was in connection with water-supply. Appointed a member of the second royal commission on the pollution of rivers in 1868, he was provided by the government with a completely equipped laboratory, in which, for a period of six years, he carried on the inquiries necessary for the purposes of that body, and was thus the means of bringing to light an enormous amount of valuable information respecting the contamination of rivers by sewage, trade-refuse, &c., and the purification of water for domestic use. In 1865, when he succeeded August Wilhelm von Hofmann at the School of Mines, he undertook the duty of making monthly reports to the registrar-general on the character of the water supplied to London, and these he continued down to the end of his life. At one time he was an unsparing critic of its quality, but in later years he became strongly convinced of its general excellence and wholesomeness.

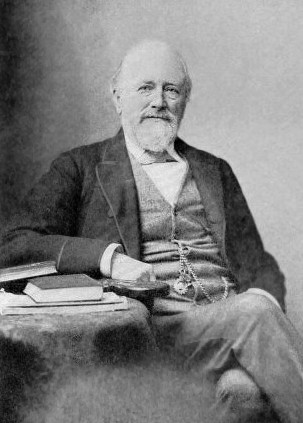
Edward Frankland

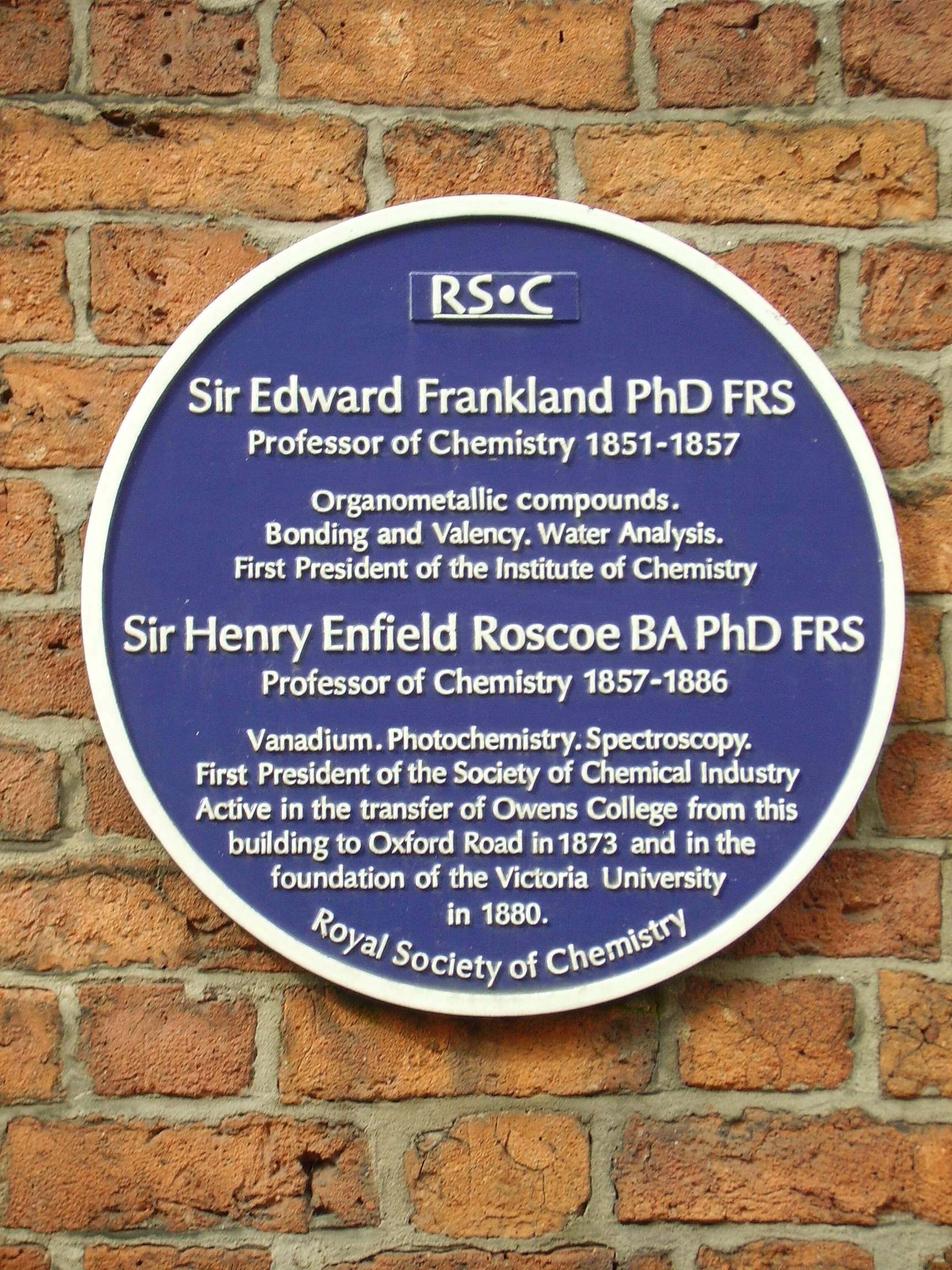
A blue plaque erected Quay Street, Manchester

Frankland's analyses were both chemical and bacteriological, and his dissatisfaction with the processes in vogue for the former at the time of his appointment caused him to spend two years in devising new and more accurate methods. In 1859 Frankland passed a night on the very top of Mont Blanc in company with John Tyndall. One of the purposes of the expedition was to discover whether the rate of combustion of a candle varies with the density of the atmosphere in which it is burnt, a question which was answered in the negative. Other observations made by Frankland at the time formed the starting-point of a series of experiments which yielded far-reaching results. He noticed that at the summit the candle gave a very poor light, and was thereby led to investigate the effect produced on luminous flames by varying the pressure of the atmosphere in which they are burning. He found that pressure increases luminosity, so that hydrogen, for example, the flame of which gives no light in normal circumstances, burns with a luminous flame under a pressure of ten or twenty atmospheres, and the inference he drew was that the presence of solid particles is not the only factor that determines the light-giving power of a flame, Further, he showed that the spectrum of a dense ignited gas resembles that of an incandescent liquid or solid, and he traced a gradual change in the spectrum of an incandescent gas under increasing pressure, the sharp lines observable when it is extremely attenuated broadening out to nebulous bands as the pressure rises, till they merge in the continuous spectrum as the gas approaches a density comparable with that of the liquid state. An application of these results to solar physics in conjunction with Sir Norman Lockyer led to the view that at least the external layers of the sun cannot consist of matter in the liquid or solid forms, but must be composed of gases or vapours.

Frankland and Lockyer were also the discoverers of helium, along with Pierre Jules César Janssen. In 1868, they noticed, in the solar spectrum, a bright yellow line which did not correspond to any substance then known. It was this line which they attributed to the then hypothetical element, helium. This was the first time an element was discovered on an extraterrestrial world before being found on the earth.

== Lectures ==
Frankland gave a variety of lectures at the Royal Institution. In 1862, 1864, and 1866, Frankland was invited to deliver the Royal Institution Christmas Lectures, speaking on the topics Air and Water; The Chemistry of a Coal and The Chemistry of Gases respectively.

== Awards and honours ==
- Fellow of the Royal Society, 1853
- Royal Medal, 1857, for Researches on the isolation of the radicals of organic compounds.
- Copley Medal, 1894
- Knight Commander of the Order of the Bath, 1897
- Blue plaque, from the Royal Society of Chemistry, at Quay Street, Manchester
- National Chemical Landmark Blue plaque from the Royal Society of Chemistry, at Lancaster Royal Grammar School, 2015
- Citation for Chemical Breakthrough Award from the Division of History of Chemistry of the American Chemical Society, for Frankland's 1852 publication on the discovery of the theory of valence, awarded to the University of Manchester, 2015
- Blue plaque from English Heritage, at 14 Lancaster Gate, Bayswater, London in June 2019
- Elected to membership of The Manchester Literary and Philosophical Society 18 January 1825

== Bibliography ==
- Frankland, Edward (1877). Experimental Researches in Pure, Applied and Physical Chemistry. London: J. Van Voorst. (collected papers to 1877)
- Frankland, Edward; Chaloner, George (1875). How to teach chemistry : hints to science teachers and students being the substance of Six Lectures delivered at the Royal College of Chemistry in June 1872. London: J. & A. Churchill.
- Frankland, Edward; Japp, Francis A. (1884). Inorganic chemistry. London: J. & A. Churchill.
- Frankland, Edward (1866). Lecture notes for chemical students : embracing mineral and organic chemistry. London: J. Van Voorst.
- Frankland, Edward (1890). Water analysis for sanitary purposes, with hints for the interpretation of results (2nd ed.). London: Gurney & Jackson.
- Frankland, Edward (1902). West, Margaret Nanny (Frankland); Colenso, Sophie Jeanette (Frankland) (eds.). Sketches from the life of Edward Frankland, born January 18, 1825, died August 9, 1899. London: Spottiswoode & Co., Ltd.
- Ueber die Isolirung des Aethyls. Inaugural-Dissertation, welche mit Genehmigung der philosophischen Facultät zu Marburg zur Erlangung der Doctorwürde einreicht Edward Frankland aus Lancaster. Marburg, 1849. Druck von George Westermann in Braunschweig. [45 pages].
