= Kevin Fong =

English doctor and broadcaster (born 1971)

Kevin Fong OBE MRCP FRCA
- Born: Kevin Jeremy San Yoong Fong; 21 May 1971 (age 55); Brent, London, England
- Education: Salvatorian College; Greenhill Tertiary College
- Alma mater: University College London (MBBS); Cranfield University (MSc)
- Awards: Royal Institution Christmas Lectures (2015)
- Scientific career
- Fields: Physiology; Anaesthesia; Space medicine
- Workplaces: University College London; Air Ambulance Kent Surrey Sussex
- Website: www.uclh.nhs.uk/our-services/find-consultant/professor-kevin-fong

Kevin Jeremy San Yoong Fong (born 21 May 1971) is a British doctor and broadcaster. He is a consultant anaesthetist and anaesthetic lead for Major Incident Planning at UCL Hospitals. He is a professor at University College London where he organises and runs an undergraduate course Extreme Environment Physiology. Fong also serves as a prehospital doctor with Air Ambulance Kent Surrey Sussex and specialises in space medicine in the UK and is the co-director of the Centre for Aviation Space and Extreme Environment Medicine (CASE Medicine), University College London.

Fong is best known for his television appearances, particularly as an occasional presenter of the long-running BBC2 science programme, Horizon. He presented the 2012 Channel 4 series Extreme A&E where he visited trauma centres all over the world. In 2015, he presented the Royal Institution Christmas Lectures, an annual series of lectures in front of a live audience of schoolchildren, and broadcast on BBC Four, with the subject How to Survive in Space.

== Early life ==
Fong was born in London and educated at St Anselm’s (Roman Catholic) primary school in Harrow on the Hill, followed by Salvatorian College, a Catholic state academy in Wealdstone and Greenhill Tertiary College in Harrow, London. He holds Bachelor's degrees in astrophysics and medicine from University College London and a master's degree in astronautics and space engineering from Cranfield University.

== Career ==
Fong has worked as a Consultant in anaesthesia and intensive care medicine at UCLH, and was co-founder and co-director of the Centre for Aviation, Space and Extreme Environment Medicine (CASE), UCL Medical School. He is Professor of Innovation and Engagement for Science and Medicine in the Department of Science, Technology, Engineering and Public Policy at University College London and an Honorary Lecturer in Physiology at King's College London.

Fong has also been a longstanding advocate of furthering the UK's involvement in international programmes of human space exploration. In 1999 he organised and hosted an international space biomedical conference at UCL, with senior representatives from ESA, NASA and the British National Space Centre, to discuss strategies for furthering UK involvement in programmes of space biomedical research. He later launched the UK's first undergraduate course in Space Medicine and Extreme Environment Physiology and contributed to several high-level reviews of human space exploration strategy, including the UK Space Exploration Working Group (2007), the UK Space Exploration Review (2008) and the Royal Astronomical Society's Commission on the Scientific Case for Human Space Flight (2007).

His post-graduate medical training includes general medicine, emergency medicine, anaesthesia and intensive care medicine. He holds three postgraduate medical diplomas: Member of the Royal College of Physicians, Fellowship of the Royal College of Anaesthetists and Fellowship of the Faculty of Intensive Care Medicine.

He was a NESTA Fellow between 2003 and 2008. During this time he took part in a diving expedition for Coral Cay and worked regularly with NASA as a visiting researcher with the Human Adaptation and Countermeasures Office at Johnson Space Center and occasionally with the medical group at Kennedy Space Center. It was during one of his visits to NASA that he completed his master's degree in Astronautics (co-supervised by Professor William H. Paloski, Director of NASA’s Space Life and Physical Sciences Research and Applications Division).

In 2011 Fong was awarded The Wellcome Trust's first Public Engagement Fellowship, designed to give the awardees the freedom, resources and environment to enable innovative public engagement projects that examine, explore and debate the big scientific challenges faced by society. This was followed in 2016 by a senior fellowship award from the Wellcome Trust in Innovation and Engagement.

In March 2020, Kevin was seconded to NHS England as National Clinical Advisor in Emergency Preparedness Resilience and Response for the COVID-19 incident.

=== In media ===
Fong was a guest in Material World, on 20 January 2000, where he argued for British participation in space travel research, particularly focusing on the long-term effects on the human frame. He presented Channel 4's science programme Superhumans in 2004, an episode of Frontiers on Radio 4, entitled Engineering Flu, and five episodes of the BBC documentary series Horizon. He also makes regular appearances for Health Check on BBC World Service and has been interviewed in other programmes.

Fong was featured in Esquire magazine's 2004 list UK's 100 Most Influential Men Under 40.

He is the author of the 2014 book, Extreme Medicine: How Exploration Transformed Medicine in the Twentieth Century. In July 2011, he wrote and presented Space Shuttle: The Final Mission (BBC), an hour-long documentary following the final mission of the Space Shuttle, meeting and interviewing those involved in the mission. He appeared as the resident scientist in the ITV series It's Not Rocket Science. He has appeared as an expert guest on The One Show.

He appeared in Operation Gold Rush with Dan Snow, 2016, following the route and trials and tribulations experienced by stampeders in the Klondike Gold Rush of the late 19th century.

Fong presented the 2019 BBC World Service podcast 13 Minutes to the Moon, detailing the Apollo 11 Moon landing. A second series was released in 2020 to mark the 50th anniversary of the Apollo 13 mission.

=== Awards and honours ===
In 2011, he was awarded a Wellcome Trust Public Engagement Fellowship.

He was appointed Officer of the Order of the British Empire (OBE) in the 2019 Birthday Honours for services to medicine and healthcare.

On 6 August 2017, he was a guest on BBC Radio 4's Desert Island Discs.

Fong presented the 2015 Royal Institution Christmas Lectures, entitled How to survive in space.

Fong is a member of the Royal College of Physicians (MRCP) and a Fellow of the Royal College of Anaesthetists (FRCA).

== Personal life ==
Fong lives in Brixton in South London, with his wife Dee and two sons.

Media offices
| Preceded by Danielle George | Royal Institution Christmas Lecturer; 2015 | Succeeded by Saiful Islam |
