= Charles Taylor (physicist) =

British physicist (1922–2002)

- Born: Charles Alfred Taylor; 14 August 1922; Kingston upon Hull, East Yorkshire, England
- Died: 7 March 2002 (aged 79); Warminster, Wiltshire, England
- Education: University of London
- Notable work: The Art and Science of Lecture Demonstration
- Spouse: Nancy Truefitt (m. 1942)
- Awards: Lawrence Bragg Medal (1983); Michael Faraday Award
- Scientific career
- Fields: Physics, crystallography
- Workplaces: Admiralty (Royal Navy, 1943-1946); University College Cardiff; Royal Institution
- Thesis: Some Estimation Problems in Spatial Statistics (1984)
- Doctoral advisor: Brian D. Ripley

Charles Alfred Taylor (14 August 1922 – 7 March 2002) was a British physicist, known for his work in crystallography and his efforts to promote science to young audiences.

== Early life and education ==
Charles Taylor was born in Hull in 1922. He began his degree at Queen Mary College (a constituent college of the University of London), but the college was subsequently evacuated to Cambridge during World War II. He graduated in 1943 and after working for the Admiralty during the war, worked as a lecturer and then a reader after completing his PhD.

== Career ==
Taylor's first work was for the Admiralty, designing radar countermeasures, work that eventually took him to Harvard University in the United States until the end of the war. He then studied for a PhD at the University of Manchester Institute of Science and Technology, and continued there from 1948 until 1965. He worked for a long time with Henry Lipson on the development of optical diffraction analogue methods. He was awarded a DSc in 1960.

In 1965 he moved with his family to Cardiff to take up the position of Chair of Physics at University College Cardiff, where the main interest of the department was X-ray crystallography, in the same field as the work he did with Lipson in Manchester.

He was appointed to the post of Visiting Professor of Experimental Physics at the Royal Institution, a post he held until 1988. He also gave many lectures to schoolchildren. In 1990, he lectured to thousands of children in Tokyo as a follow-up to his Christmas Lectures in London the previous year.

== Publications ==
Taylor was the author of a number of books, including The Art and Science of Lecture Demonstration. He co-wrote, with Stephen Pople, the worldwide-selling Oxford Children's Book of Science (1994).

== Lectures ==
As well as his work in research, Taylor had close links to the Royal Institution. He had always had a strong interest in music and its relationship with physics. In 1971, he lectured to schoolchildren for the Royal Institution Christmas Lectures on The Sounds of Music, covering physics and music. In 1989 he became the third person since 1945 to deliver a second series of Christmas lectures, Exploring Music.

== Honours ==
Taylor was awarded the Lawrence Bragg Medal by the Institute of Physics in 1983 for his outstanding and sustained contributions to physics education. In 1986 he was unanimously awarded the first Michael Faraday Award by the Royal Society for communicating science to public audiences. Altogether, he gave over 150 lectures to schoolchildren at the Royal Institution, as well as presenting eight Friday evening discourses there.

== Personal life ==
Taylor married Nancy Truefitt in 1942. They had three children. He died at Warminster, Wiltshire on 7 March 2002.
