= Extreme A&E =

- Genre: Medical Documentary
- Presented by: Kevin Fong
- Country of origin: United Kingdom
- Original language: English
- No. of series: 1
- No. of episodes: 4

Original release
- Network: Channel 4
- Release: 19 May – 9 June 2012

Extreme A&E is a British medical documentary set in various trauma centres across the world. It follows Kevin Fong as he visits world-renowned trauma centres. It aims to show trauma medicine through the eyes of a doctor.

== Overview ==
This Channel 4 documentary series gives viewers behind the scenes access to four major international Accident & Emergency Departments. Series 1 aired every Thursday 10pm and consisted of four one-hour episodes. The filming took place over a week at each location.

The programmes show the way the staff work together as a team to treat seriously ill patients involved in road traffic accidents and violent assaults.

- Episode 1 – Melbourne (filmed at The Alfred Hospital)
- Episode 2 – The Bronx (filmed at St. Barnabas Hospital)
- Episode 3 – London (filmed at King's College Hospital)
- Episode 4 – Johannesburg (filmed at Charlotte Maxeke Johannesburg Academic Hospital)

The series will premiere as Extreme ER in Australia on 4 June 2015 on Nat Geo People.
