= Luminous flame =

Burning flame which is brightly visible

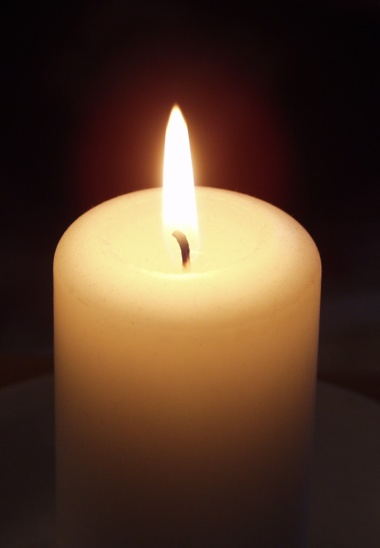
A luminous candle flame

A luminous flame is a burning flame which is brightly visible. Much of its output is in the form of visible light, as well as heat or light in the non-visible wavelengths.

An early study of flame luminosity was conducted by Michael Faraday and became part of his series of Royal Institution Christmas Lectures, The Chemical History of a Candle.

== Luminosity ==
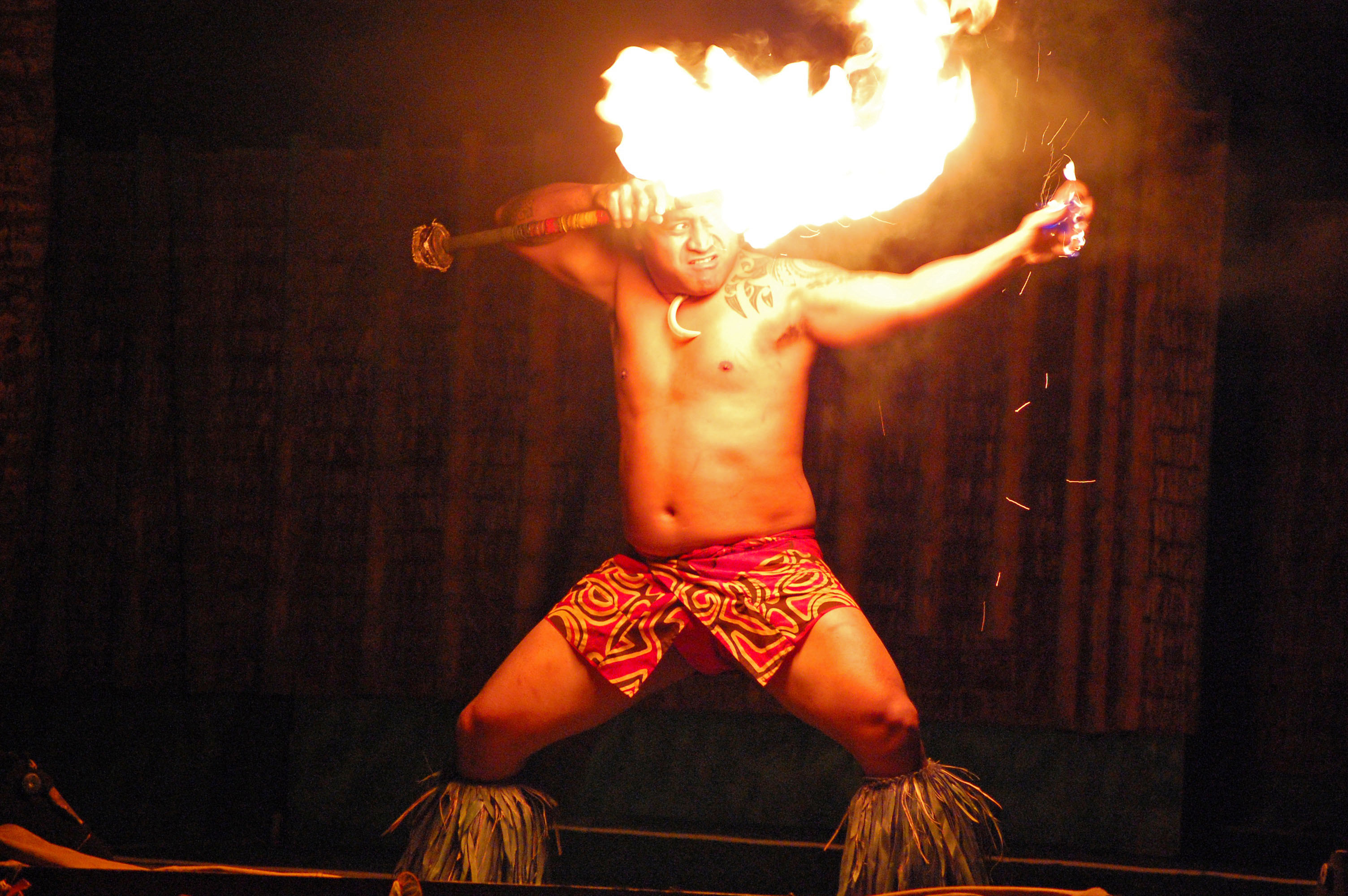
Circus fire arts rely on a brightly luminous flame, ideally with minimal heat output

In the simplest case, the yellow flame is luminous due to small soot particles in the flame which are heated to incandescence. Producing a deliberately luminous flame requires either a shortage of combustion air (as in a Bunsen burner) or a local excess of fuel (as for a kerosene torch). Because of this dependency upon relatively inefficient combustion, luminosity is associated with diffusion flames and is lessened with premixed flames.

The flame is yellow because of its temperature. To produce enough soot to be luminous, the flame is operated at a lower temperature than its efficient heating flame (see Bunsen burner). The colour of simple incandescence is due to black-body radiation. By Planck's law, as the temperature decreases, the peak of the black-body radiation curve moves to longer wavelengths, i.e. from the blue to the yellow. However, the blue light from a gas burner's premixed flame is primarily a product of molecular emission (Swan bands) rather than black-body radiation.

Other factors, particularly the fuel chemistry and its propensity for forming soot, have an influence on luminosity.

== Bunsen burner ==
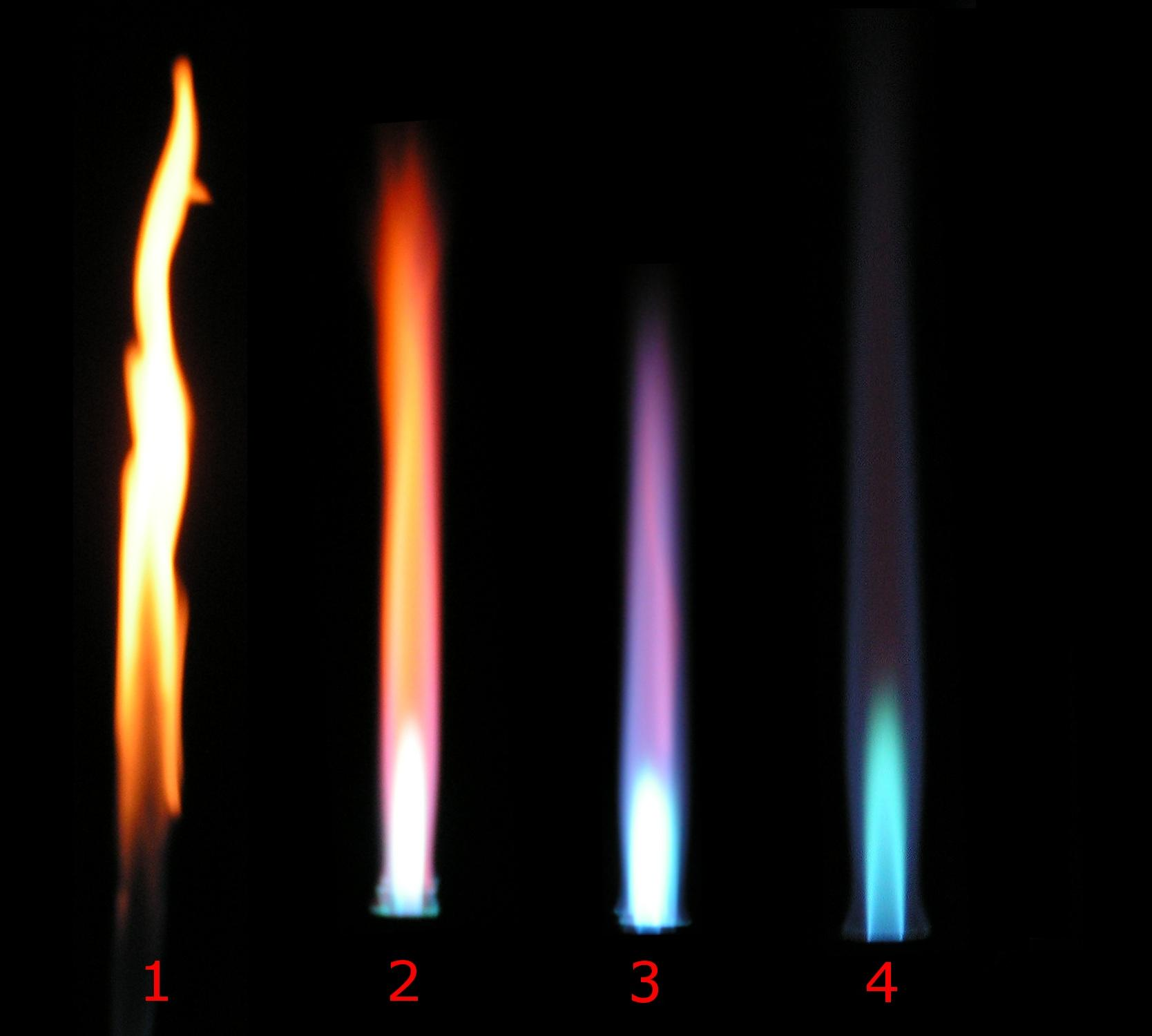
A variety of Bunsen burner flames. Bunsen burners may be adjusted from a highly luminous flame (left) to a hotter 'roaring blue flame' (right)

One of the most familiar instances of a luminous flame is produced by a Bunsen burner. This burner has a controllable air supply and a constant gas jet: when the air supply is reduced, a highly luminous, and thus visible, orange 'safety flame' is produced. For heating work, the air inlet is opened and the burner produces a much hotter blue flame.

== Combustion efficiency ==
Efficient combustion relies on the complete combustion of the fuel. Production of soot and/or carbon monoxide represents a waste of fuel (further burning was possible) the potential problem of soot build-up in burners. Heating burners are thus usually designed to produce a non-luminous flame.

== Oil lamps ==
Lamps for illumination rather than heat may use a deliberately luminous flame. A more efficient method overall uses a mantle instead. Like the incandescent soot in a luminous flame, the mantle is heated and then glows. The flame does not provide much light itself, and so a more heat-efficient non-luminous flame is preferred. Unlike simple soot, a mantle uses rare-earth elements to provide a bright white glow; the colour of the glow comes from the spectral lines of these elements, not from simple black-body radiation.

== Flame testing ==
When performing a flame test, the colour of a flame is affected by external materials added to it. A non-luminous flame is used, to avoid masking the test colour by the flame's colour.
