= William Coates (technician) =

William Albert Coates MBE (7 November 1919 – 7 October 1993) was a science communicator, lecturer and technician who worked at the Royal Institution in London from 1948 to 1986 and was a popular figure on television shows. As a lecture assistant he designed experiments for, and appeared alongside Lawrence Bragg numerous times as part of the televised Royal Institution Christmas Lectures. He was awarded the Lawrence Bragg Medal in 1975.

== Life and career ==
Coates was born in Shoreditch in the East End of London on 7 November 1919, to policeman Francis Thomas Coates (c.1878–1950) and his wife, Lilian Martha née Fenniman. He went to Shoreditch Grammar School and became an apprentice at the Exchange Telegraph Company in 1934.

Coates joined the armed services in 1939 as a private. He later joined the parachute regiment and was involved in Normandy Landings. He left with the rank of captain. After the Second World War, Coates worked as a technical assistant at Charing Cross Medical School before Eric Rideal recruited him to work at the Royal Institution.

Initially, Coates worked as a technician and experimental officer with x-ray diffractometers as part of David Phillips' team. In the 1950s, Coates became involved with lecture demonstrations working particularly closely William Lawrence Bragg. Bragg had advised "Always, if possible Coates, never talk about science, show it to them." He acted as assistant to Bragg in many of Royal Institution's lectures. In fact, Coates worked on the Christmas lectures for nearly two decades and, it has been argued by Frank A. J. L. James, that:

...Coates would appear on the nation’s screen each Christmas, keeping the lectures going and making witty interjections. Arguably, his [Coates] presence contributed significantly to the success of the televised lectures.

In one popular demonstration Coates swallowed a pressure sensitive capsule with a radio transmitter. Bragg then invited children to punch Coates in the stomach which activated the capsule and sent a radio signal to a speaker. The children could hear the resulting squeaks from a speaker. He demonstrated the action of lysozyme in the 1965. Bragg wrote the following to a future Christmas lecturer, Heinz Wolff:

The radio pill was an uproarious success… the children almost doubled up my assistant Coates with their enthusiastic thumps.

Coates' work with Bragg was captured by Terence Cuneo in 1962 in an oil painting showing Bragg giving the 1961 Christmas lecture in the Royal Institution theatre with Coates operating a Wimshurst machine to generate static electricity as part of the demonstration.

Coates was also involved in producing several Open University foundation courses. After his retirement he remained as part time consultant at both the Royal Institution and at Imperial College London. Coates was made MBE in 1980.

Coates died on 7 October 1993.
