= Charles J. M. Stirling =

British chemist

Charles James Matthew Stirling FRS, CChem, FRSC, FLSW (born 1930) is an Emeritus Professor of Chemistry, at the University of Sheffield, in England.

Stirling was born on 8 December 1930 to Brigadier Alexander Dickson Stirling and his wife Millicent Stirling

He was made a Fellow of the Royal Society of Chemistry in 1967, and a Fellow of the Royal Society in 1986; and gave the Royal Institution Christmas Lectures in 1992.

The Royal Society describe him as having "made important contributions to physical organic chemistry through his elucidation of organic reaction mechanisms".

He is a Founding Fellow of the Learned Society of Wales.

== See also ==
- Peter Maitlis – British chemist (1933–2022)
- Fraser Stoddart – Scottish chemist (1942–2024)
