= Royal Institution Christmas Lectures =

Annual UK Christmas scientific lecture series aimed at children, started 1825

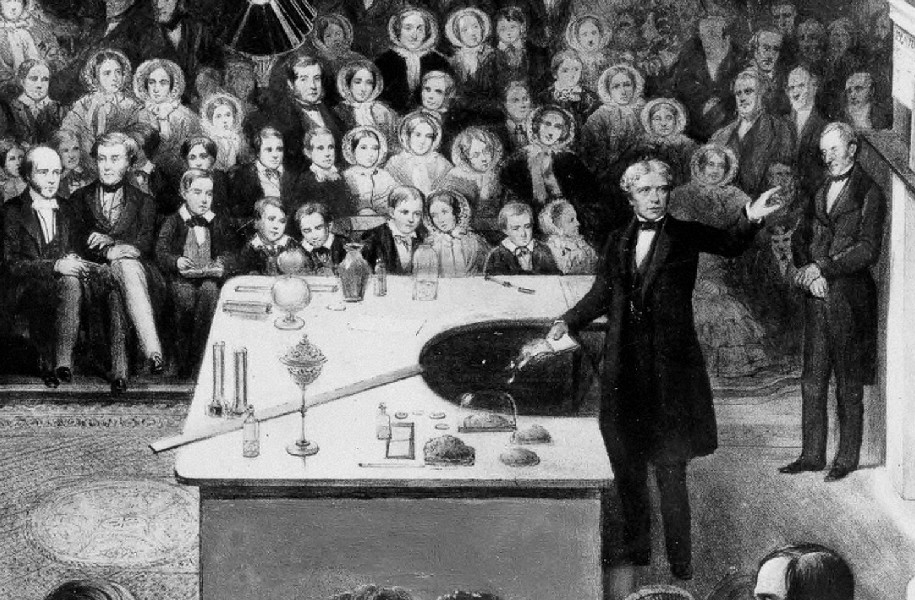
Michael Faraday delivering a Christmas Lecture in 1856

The Royal Institution Christmas Lectures are a series of lectures on a single topic each, which have been held at the Royal Institution in London each year since 1825. The lectures present scientific subjects to a general audience, including young people, in an informative and entertaining manner. The Managers of the Royal Institution conceived and initiated the Christmas Lecture series in 1825, at a time when organised education for young people was scarce. Many of the Christmas Lectures were published.

== History ==
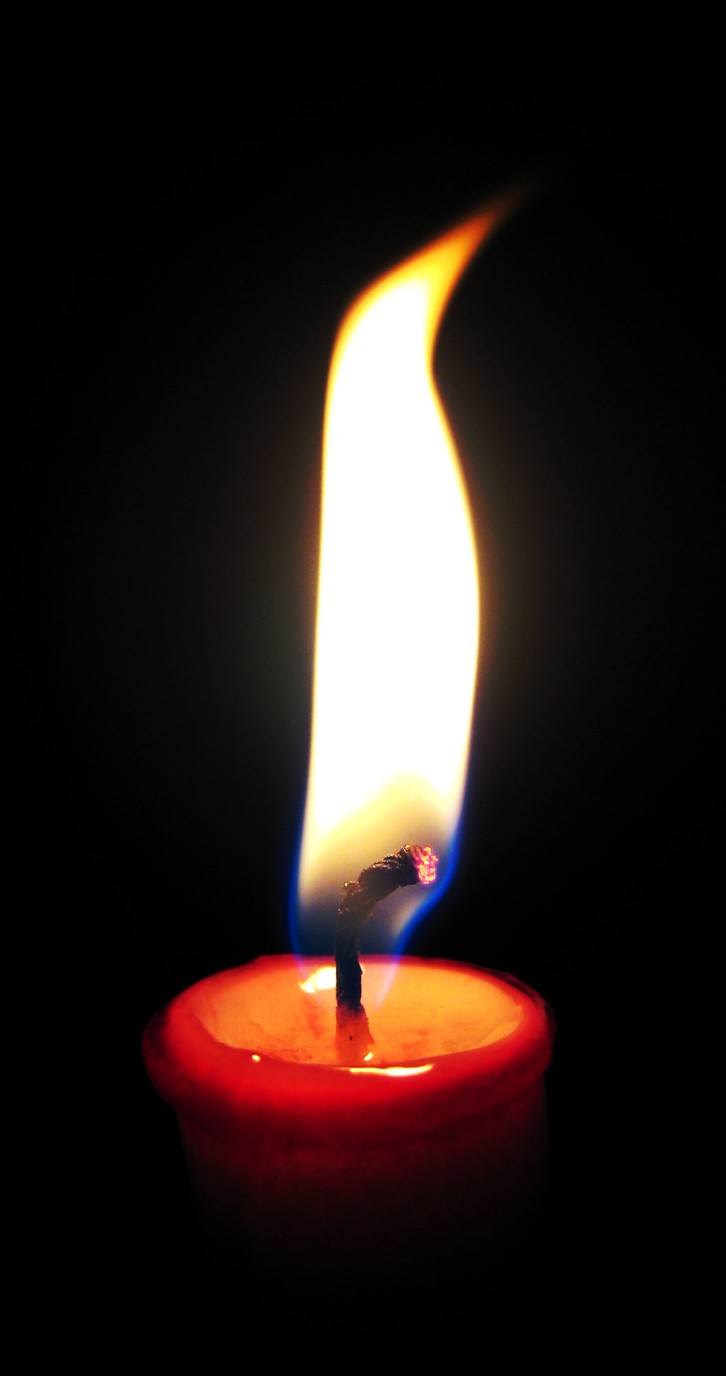
A close-up image of a candle showing the wick and the various parts of the flame. Michael Faraday lectured on "The Chemical History of a Candle".

The Royal Institution's Christmas Lectures were first held in 1825, and have continued on an annual basis since then except for four years during the Second World War. They have been hosted each year at the Royal Institution itself, except in 1929 and between 2005 and 2006, each time due to refurbishment of the building. Michael Faraday was the most famous lecturer, hosting the series on nineteen occasions. Recent series have toured Japan, Korea and Singapore among other countries.

The Nobel laureate Sir William Bragg gave the Christmas lectures on four occasions, and his co-laureate son Sir Lawrence Bragg gave them twice. Other notable lecturers have included Desmond Morris (1964), Eric Laithwaite (1966 & 1974), Sir George Porter (1969 & 1976), Sir David Attenborough (1973), Heinz Wolff (1975), Carl Sagan (1977), Richard Dawkins (1991), Susan Greenfield (1994), Dame Nancy Rothwell (1998), Monica Grady (2003), Sue Hartley (2009), Alison Woollard (2013), Danielle George (2014), and Saiful Islam (2016).

In 1994, Professor Susan Greenfield became the first female scientist to present the Christmas Lectures. The first non-white science lecturer was Kevin Fong in 2015, and in August 2020 it was announced that Professor Christopher Jackson would jointly present the 2020 lecture series, thus becoming the first black scientist to do so.

The props for the lectures are designed and created by the Royal Institution's science demonstration technician, a post which Faraday previously held. A popular technician, with the advent of television, serving from 1948 to 1986, was Bill Coates. The technician is informed of the general subject of the lectures during spring, but the specifics are not settled until September, with the recordings made in mid-December. By 2009, the lectures had expanded to a series of five sessions each year. However, in 2010 the Royal Institution cut back on costs, as it had become over £2 million in debt, and this resulted in a reduction from five lectures to three.

=== Television ===
A 15-minute preview of a Christmas Lecture by G. I. Taylor was the first to be televised, in December 1936, on the BBC's fledgling Television Service. This was the first scientific experiment shown on television. Occasional lectures were broadcast in the subsequent decades, and each series was broadcast in its entirety on BBC Two from 1966 to 1999 and Channel 4 from 2000 to 2004. In 2000, one of the lectures was broadcast live for the first time.

Following the end of Channel 4's contract to broadcast the lectures, there were concerns that they might simply be dropped from scheduling as the channel was negotiating with the Royal Institution over potential changes to the format, while the BBC announced that "The BBC will not show the lectures again, because it feels the broadcasting environment has moved on in the last four years." Channel Five subsequently agreed to show the lectures from 2005 to 2008, an announcement which was met with derision from academics. The lectures were broadcast on More4 in 2009. In 2010, the lectures returned to the BBC after a ten-year absence from the broadcaster, and have been shown on BBC Four each year since then.

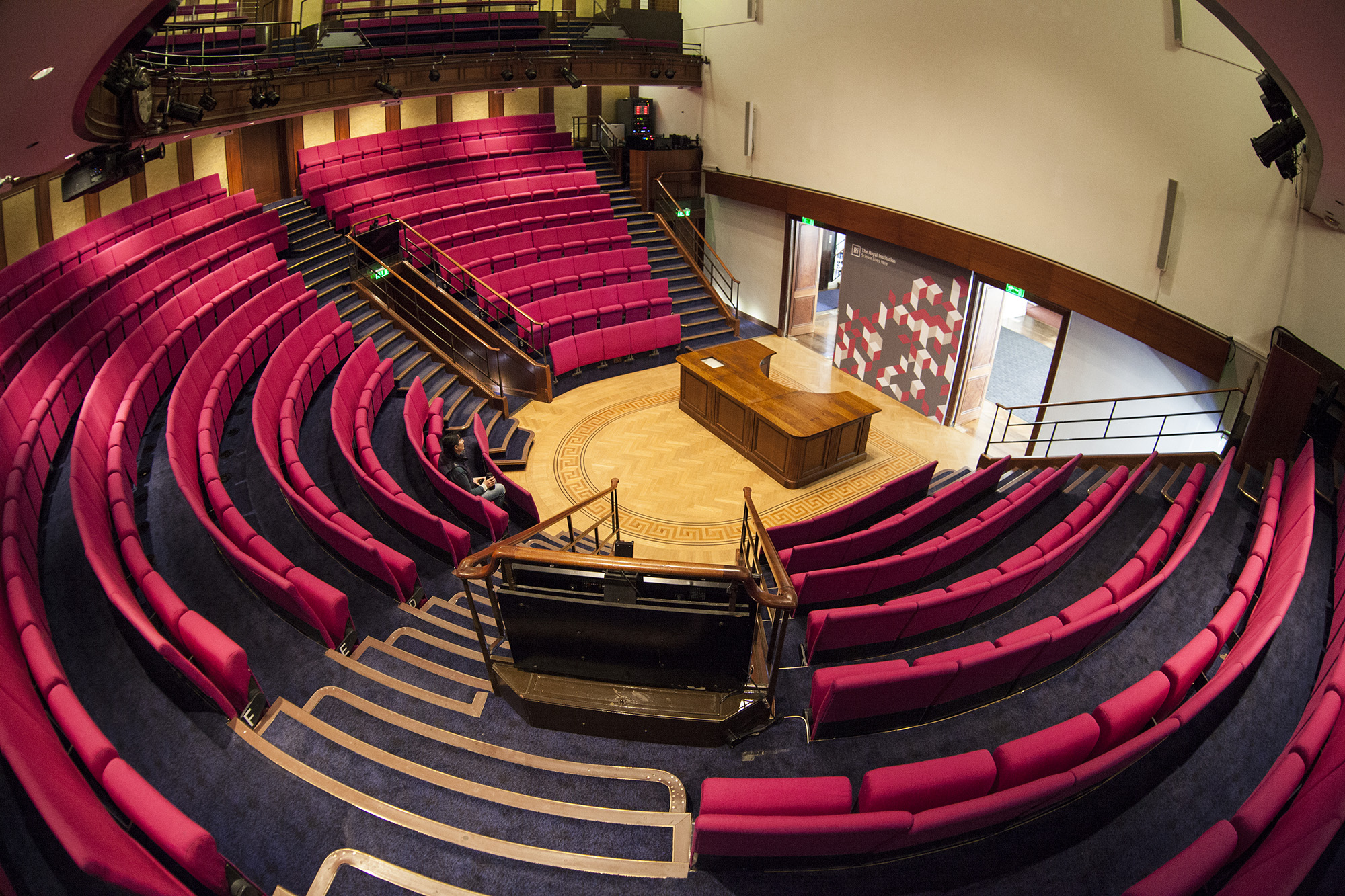
The Lecture Theatre today

In January 2022, the RI launched an appeal to trace copies of those televised lectures which are missing from the BBC's archives, these being the complete series of five lectures each from 1966, 1967, 1969, 1970 and 1971, plus one episode of David Attenborough's 1973 lectures, "The language of animals".

== List of Christmas lectures ==
=== 1825 to 1965 ===
The following is a complete list of the Christmas Lectures from 1825 to 1965:

Year	Lecturer(s)	Title of series
1825	John Millington	Experimental Philosophy, including Dynamics, Mechanics, Pneumatics, Hydrostatics, Optics, Magnetism, Electricity, and Astronomy.
1826	John Wallis	Astronomy
1827	Michael Faraday	Chemistry
1828	George John Wood	The History, Architecture, Rites, Ceremonies, Manners, Customs &c. of the Ancient World
1829	Michael Faraday	Electricity
1830	Thomas Webster	Geology
1831	James Rennie	Zoology
1832	Michael Faraday	Chemistry
1833	John Lindley	Botany
1834	William Thomas Brande	Chemistry
1835	Michael Faraday	Electricity
1836	William Thomas Brande	Chemistry of the Gases
1837	Michael Faraday	Chemistry
1838	John Wallis	Astronomy
1839	William Thomas Brande	The Chemistry of the Atmosphere and the Ocean
1840	John Frederic Daniell	The First Principles of Franklinic Electricity
1841	Michael Faraday	The Rudiments of Chemistry
1842	William Thomas Brande	The Chemistry of the Non-Metallic Elements
1843	Michael Faraday	First Principles of Electricity
1844	William Thomas Brande	The Chemistry of the Gases
1845	Michael Faraday	The Rudiments of Chemistry
1846	John Wallis	The Rudiments of Astronomy
1847	William Thomas Brande	The Elements of Organic Chemistry
1848	Michael Faraday	The Chemical History of a Candle
1849	Robert Walker	The Properties of Matter and the Laws of Motion
1850	William Thomas Brande	The Chemistry of Coal
1851	Michael Faraday	Attractive Forces
1852	Michael Faraday	Chemistry
1853	Michael Faraday	Voltaic Electricity
1854	Michael Faraday	The Chemistry of Combustion
1855	Michael Faraday	The Distinctive Properties of the Common Metals
1856	Michael Faraday	Attraction
1857	Michael Faraday	Static Electricity
1858	Michael Faraday	Metalline Properties
1859	Michael Faraday	The Various Forces of Matter and their Relations to Each Other
1860	Michael Faraday	The Chemical History of a Candle
1861	John Tyndall	Light
1862	Edward Frankland	Air and Water
1863	John Tyndall	Electricity at Rest and Electricity in Motion
1864	Edward Frankland	The Chemistry of a Coal
1865	John Tyndall	Sound
1866	Edward Frankland	The Chemistry of Gases
1867	John Tyndall	Heat and Cold
1868	William Odling	The Chemical Changes of Carbon
1869	John Tyndall	Light
1870	William Odling	Burning and Unburning
1871	John Tyndall	Ice, Water, Vapour and Air
1872	William Odling	Air and Gas
1873	John Tyndall	The Motion and Sensation of Sound
1874	John Hall Gladstone	The Voltaic Battery
1875	John Tyndall	Experimental Electricity
1876	John Hall Gladstone	The Chemistry of Fire
1877	John Tyndall	Heat, Visible and Invisible
1878	James Dewar	A Soap Bubble
1879	John Tyndall	Water and Air
1880	James Dewar	Atoms
1881	Robert Stawell Ball	The Sun, the Moon and the Planets
1882	John Tyndall	Light and the Eye
1883	James Dewar	Alchemy in Relation to Modern Science
1884	John Tyndall	The Sources of Electricity
1885	James Dewar	The Story of a Meteorite
1886	James Dewar	The Chemistry of Light and Photography
1887	Robert Stawell Ball	Astronomy
1888	James Dewar	Clouds and Cloudland
1889	Arthur Rücker	Electricity
1890	James Dewar	Frost and Fire
1891	John Gray McKendrick	Life in Motion; or the Animal Machine
1892	Robert Stawell Ball	Astronomy
1893	James Dewar	Air: Gaseous and Liquid
1894	John Ambrose Fleming	The Work of an Electric Current
1895	John Gray McKendrick	Sound, Hearing and Speech
1896	Sylvanus Phillips Thompson	Light, Visible and Invisible
1897	Oliver Lodge	The Principles of the Electric Telegraph
1898	Robert Stawell Ball	Astronomy
1899	Charles Vernon Boys	Fluids in Motion and at Rest
1900	Robert Stawell Ball	Great Chapters from the Book of Nature
1901	John Ambrose Fleming	Waves and Ripples in Water, Air and Aether
1902	Henry Selby Hele-Shaw	Locomotion : On the Earth, Through the Water, in the Air
1903	Edwin Ray Lankester	Extinct Animals
1904	Henry Cunynghame	Ancient and Modern Methods of Measuring Time
1905	Herbert Hall Turner	Astronomy
1906	William Duddell	Signalling to a Distance
1907	David Gill	Astronomy, Old and New
1908	William Stirling	The Wheel of Life
1909	William Duddell	Modern Electricity
1910	Silvanus Phillips Thompson	Sound: Musical and Non-Musical
1911	Peter Chalmers Mitchell	The Childhood of Animals
1912	James Dewar	Christmas Lecture Epilogues
1913	Herbert Hall Turner	A Voyage in Space
1914	Charles Vernon Boys	Science in the Home
1915	Herbert Hall Turner	Wireless Messages from the Stars
1916	Arthur Keith	The Human Machine Which All Must Work
1917	John Ambrose Fleming	Our Useful Servants : Magnetism and Electricity
1918	D'Arcy Wentworth Thompson	The Fish of the Sea
1919	William Henry Bragg	The World of Sound
1920	John Arthur Thomson	The Haunts of Life
1921	John Ambrose Fleming	Electric Waves and Wireless Telephony
1922	Herbert Hall Turner	Six Steps Up the Ladder to the Stars
1923	William Henry Bragg	Concerning the Nature of Things
1924	Francis Balfour-Browne	Concerning the Habits of Insects
1925	William Henry Bragg	Old Trades and New Knowledge
1926	Archibald Vivian Hill	Nerves and Muscles: How We Feel and Move
1927	Edward Andrade	Engines
1928	Alexander Wood	Sound Waves and their Uses
1929	Stephen Glanville	How Things Were Done in Ancient Egypt
1930	Arthur Mannering Tyndall	The Electric Spark
1931	William Henry Bragg	The Universe of Light
1932	Alexander Oliver Rankine	The Round of the Waters
1933	James Hopwood Jeans	Through Space and Time
1934	William Lawrence Bragg	Electricity
1935	Charles Edward Kenneth Mees	Photography
1936	Geoffrey Ingram Taylor	Ships
1937	Julian Huxley	Rare Animals and the Disappearance of Wild Life
1938	James Kendall	Young Chemists and Great Discoveries
1939–1942	No lectures due to the Second World War	
1943	Edward Andrade	Vibrations and Waves
1944	Harold Spencer Jones	Astronomy in our Daily Life
1945	Robert Watson-Watt	Wireless
1946	Hamilton Hartridge	Colours and How We See Them
1947	Eric Keightley Rideal	Chemical Reactions: How They Work
1948	Frederic Bartlett	The Mind at Work and Play
1949	Percy Dunsheath	The Electric Current
1950	Edward Andrade	Waves and Vibrations
1951	James Gray	How Animals Move
1952	Frank Sherwood Taylor	How Science Has Grown
1953	John Ashworth Ratcliffe	The Uses of Radio Waves
1954	Frank Whittle	The Story of Petroleum
1955	Harry W. Melville	Big Molecules
1956	Harry Baines	Photography
1957	Julian Huxley and James Fisher	Birds
1958	John Ashworth Ratcliffe, James M. Stagg, Robert L. F. Boyd, Graham Sutton, George E. R. Deacon, Gordon de Quetteville Robin	International Geophysical Year
1959	Thomas Allibone	The Release and Use of Atomic Energy
1960	Vernon Ellis Cosslett	Seeing the Very Small
1961	William Lawrence Bragg	Electricity
1962	R. E. D. (Richard Evelyn Donohue) Bishop	Vibration
1963	Ronald King	Energy
1964	Desmond Morris	Animal Behaviour
1965	Bernard Lovell, Francis Graham-Smith, Martin Ryle, Antony Hewish	Exploration of the Universe

=== Since 1966 ===
The following is a list of televised Christmas Lectures from 1966 onward as of December 2025:

Year	Lecturer(s)	Title of series	Lecture titles	Network
1966	Eric Laithwaite	The Engineer in Wonderland	1. The White Rabbit; 2. Only the Grin was Left; 3. The Caucus Race; 4. Curiouser and Curiouser; 5. If only I were the right size to do it; 6. It's the Oldest Rule in the Book	BBC Two
1967	Richard L. Gregory	The Intelligent Eye	1. Ancient Eyes and Simple Brains; 2. Learning to See Things; 3. Playing with Illusions; 4. How Illusions Play Games with Us; 5. Human Eyes in Space; 6. The Future-Machines that See?	BBC Two
1968	Philip Morrison	Gulliver's Laws: The Physics of Large and Small	1. The World of Captain Gulliver; 2. Meat and Drink Sufficient...; 3. A Prodigious Leap?; 4. Lilliput and Brobdingnag since the Industrial Revolution; 5. Dwarf and Giant Numbers; 6. Beyond the Map	BBC Two
1969	George Porter	Time Machines	1. In the Beginning...; 2. Clockwork Harmony; 3. The Tick of the Atom; 4. Big Time, Little Time; 5. Faster, Faster; 6. To the Ends of Time	BBC Two
1970	John Napier	Monkeys Without Tails: A Giraffe's Eye-view of Man	1. Man has a very short neck and no tail; 2. Man comes in several different sizes and shapes; 3. Fancy having to climb trees in order to eat; 4. Man chooses a sensible place to live at last; 5. Why choose to walk on two legs when it is much safer on four?; 6. What's the idea of shooting at us?	BBC Two
1971	Charles Taylor	Sounds of Music: The Science of Tones and Tune	1. Making and Measuring the Waves; 2. From Small Beginnings; 3. Growing and Changing; 4. Craftsmanship and Technology; 5. On the Way to the Ear; 6. The End of the Journey	BBC Two
1972	Geoffrey G. Gouriet	Ripples in the Ether: The Science of Radio Communication	1. How It All Began; 2. Getting Rid of the Wires; 3. The Sound of Broadcasting; 4. Pictures With and Without Wires; 5. But Electrons aren't Coloured!; 6. Vision of the Future	BBC Two
1973	David Attenborough	The Language of Animals	1. Beware!; 2. Be Mine; 3. Parents and Children; 4. Simple Signs and Complicated Communications (lost from archives ); 5. Foreign Languages; 6. Animal Language, Human Language	BBC Two
1974	Eric Laithwaite	The Engineer Through the Looking Glass	1. Looking Glass House; 2. Tweedledum and Tweedledee; 3. Jam Yesterday, Jam Tomorrow; 4. The Jabberwock; 5. The Time has come the Walrus said; 6. It's my own Invention	BBC Two
1975	Heinz Wolff	Signals from the Interior	1. You as an engine; 2. Pumps pipes and flows; 3. Spikes and waves; 4. Probes, sondes and sounds; 5. Looking through your skin; 6. Signals from the mind	BBC Two
1976	George Porter	The Natural History of a Sunbeam	1. First Light; 2. Light and Life; 3. A Leaf from Nature; 4. Candles from the Sun; 5. Making Light Work; 6. Survival Under the Sun	BBC Two
1977	Carl Sagan	The Planets	1. The Earth as a Planet; 2. The Outer Solar System and Life; 3. The History of Mars; 4. Mars before Viking; 5. Mars after Viking; 6. Planetary Systems Beyond Our Sun	BBC Two
1978	Erik Christopher Zeeman	Mathematics into Pictures	1. Linking and Knotting; 2. Numbers and Geometry; 3. Infinity and Perspective; 4. Games and Evolution; 5. Waves and Music; 6. Catastrophe and Psychology	BBC Two
1979	Eric M. Rogers	Atoms for Engineering Minds: A Circus of Experiments	1. Getting to Know Atoms; 2. Molecules in Motion; 3. Electrified Atoms; 4. Atoms that Explode; 5. Atoms and Energy; 6. Seeing Atoms at Last	BBC Two
1980	David Chilton Phillips with Max Perutz in Lecture 5	The Chicken, the Egg and the Molecules	1. What are chickens made of?; 2. Machine tools of life; 3. Muscle power; 4. Eggs, genes and proteins; 5. Haemoglobin: the breathing molecule; 6. Molecules at work	BBC Two
1981	Reginald Victor Jones	From Magna Carta to Microchip	1. Principles, Standards and Methods; 2. The Measurement of Time; 3. More and More About Less and Less; 4. Onwards to the Stars; 5. Measurement and Navigation in War; 6. Some Impacts of Measurement on Life: And Can We Take it too Far?	BBC Two
1982	Colin Blakemore	Common Sense	1. Making Sense; 2. The Sound of Silence; 3. The Sixth Sense – and the Rest; 4. Show Me the Way to Go Home; 5. Vive la différence; 6. Enchanted Loom	BBC Two
1983	Leonard Maunder	Machines in Motion	1. Driving Forces; 2. Gathering Momentum; 3. Vibration; 4. Under Control; 5. Fluids and Flight; 6. Living Machines	BBC Two
1984	Walter Bodmer	The Message of the Genes	1. We're All Different; 2. The Spice of Life; 3. Genetic Engineering; 4. Bodies and Antibodies; 5. Normal Cells and Cancer Cells; 6. When Will Pigs Have Wings?	BBC Two
1985	John David Pye	Communicating	1. No Man is an Island; 2. Animal Talk; 3. The Bionic Bat; 4. The Pace of Technology; 5. The Integrated Body; 6. Computers	BBC Two
1986	Lewis Wolpert	Frankenstein's Quest: Development of Life	1. First Take an Egg...; 2. The Medium and the Message; 3. The Right Stuff; 4. Genes and Flies; 5. Chain of Command; 6. Growing Up and Growing Old	BBC Two
1987	John Meurig Thomas and David Phillips	Crystals and Lasers	1. The Micro-world; 2. The architecture of crystals; 3. Crystal Miracles; 4. Constructing a LASER; 5. The Light Fantastic; 6. Crystals, lasers and the human body	BBC Two
1988	Gareth Roberts	The Home of the Future	1. Appliance Science; 2. Home, Safe Home; 3. Electronics for Pleasure; 4. Home, Smart Home; 5. Mixers, Meters and Molecules	BBC Two
1989	Charles Taylor	Exploring Music	1. What Is Music?; 2. The Essence of an Instrument; 3. Science, Strings and Symphonies; 4. Technology, Trumpets and Tunes; 5. Scales, Synthesisers and Samplers	BBC Two
1990	Malcolm Longair	Origins	1. The Grand Design; 2. The Birth of the Stars; 3. The Origin of Quasars; 4. The Origin of the Galaxies; 5. The Origin of the Universe	BBC Two
1991	Richard Dawkins	Growing Up in the Universe	1. Waking Up in the Universe; 2. Designed and Designoid Objects; 3. Climbing Mount Improbable; 4. The Ultraviolet Garden; 5. The Genesis of Purpose	BBC Two
1992	Charles J. M. Stirling	Our World Through the Looking Glass	1. Man in the Mirror; 2. Narwhals, Palindromes and Chesterfield Station; 3. The Handed Molecule; 4. Symmetry, Sensation and Sex; 5. In the Hands of Giants	BBC Two
1993	Frank Close	The Cosmic Onion	1. A is for Atoms; 2. To the Centre of the Sun; 3. Invaders from Outer Space; 4. Anti-Matter Matters; 5. An Hour to Make the Universe	BBC Two
1994	Susan Greenfield	Journey to the Centre of the Brain	1. The Electric Ape; 2. Through a Glass Darkly; 3. Bubble Bubble Toil and Trouble; 4. The Seven Ages of the Brain; 5. The Mind's I	BBC Two
1995	James Jackson	Planet Earth, An Explorer's Guide	1. On the Edge of the World; 2. Secrets of the Deep; 3. Volcanoes: Melting the Earth; 4. The Puzzle of the Continents; 5. Waterworld	BBC Two
1996	Simon Conway Morris	The History in our Bones	1. Staring into the Abyss; 2. The Fossils Come Alive; 3. The Great Dyings: Life after Death; 4. Innovations And Novelty; 5. Feet on the Ground, Head in the Stars: The History of Man	BBC Two
1997	Ian Stewart	The Magical Maze	1. Sunflowers and Snowflakes; 2. The Pattern of Tiny Feet; 3. Outrageous Fortune; 4. Chaos and Cauliflowers; 5. Fearful Symmetry	BBC Two
1998	Nancy Rothwell	Staying Alive	1. Sense and Sensitivity; 2. Fats and figures; 3. Chilling out; 4. Times of our lives; 5. Pushing the limits	BBC Two
1999	Neil F. Johnson	Arrows of Time	1. Back to the Future; 2. Catching the Waves; 3. The Quantum Leap; 4. Edge of Chaos; 5. Shaping the Future	BBC Two
2000	Kevin Warwick	Rise of the Robots	1. Anatomy of an Android; 2. Things That Think; 3. Remote Robots; 4. Bionic Bodies; 5. I, Robot	Channel 4
2001	John Sulston	The Secrets of Life	1. What is life?; 2. How do I grow?; 3. What am I?; 4. Can we fix it?; 5. Future of life?	Channel 4
2002	Tony Ryan	Smart Stuff	1. The Spider that Spun a Suspension Bridge; 2. The Trainer That Ran Over The World; 3. The Phone that Shrank the Planet; 4. The Plaster that Stretches Life; 5. The Ice Cream that Will Freeze Granny	Channel 4
2003	Monica Grady	Voyage in Space and Time	1. Blast Off; 2. Mission to Mars; 3. Planet Patrol; 4. Collision Course; 5. Anybody Out There?	Channel 4
2004	Lloyd Peck	Antarctica	1. Ice People; 2. Ice Life; 3. Ice World	Channel 4
2005	John Krebs	The Truth About Food	1. The ape that cooks; 2. Yuck or yummy?; 3. You are what you eat; 4. When food goes wrong; 5. Food for the future	Channel Five
2006	Marcus du Sautoy	The Num8er My5teries	1. The curious incident of the never-ending numbers; 2. The quest to predict the future; 3. The story of the elusive shapes; 4. The case of the uncrackable code; 5. The secret of the winning streak	Channel Five
2007	Hugh Montgomery	Back from the Brink: The Science of Survival	1. Peak Performance; 2. Completely Stuffed; 3. Grilled and Chilled; 4. Fight, Flight and Fright; 5. Luck, Genes and Stupidity	Channel Five
2008	Christopher Bishop	Hi-tech Trek	1. Breaking the Speed Limit; 2. Chips with Everything; 3. The Ghost in the Machine; 4. Untangling the Web; 5. Digital Intelligence	Channel Five
2009	Sue Hartley	The 300-Million-Year War	1. Plant Wars; 2. The Animals Strike Back; 3. Talking Trees; 4. Dangerous to Delicious; 5. Weapons of the Future	More4
2010	Mark Miodownik	Size Matters	1. Why Elephants Can't Dance but Hamsters Can Skydive; 2. Why Chocolate Melts and Jet Planes Don't; 3. Why Mountains Are So Small	BBC Four
2011	Bruce Hood	Meet Your Brain	1. What's in your head?; 2. Who's in charge here anyway?; 3. Are you thinking what I'm thinking?	BBC Four
2012	Peter Wothers	The Modern Alchemist	1. Air: the elixir of life; 2. Water: the fountain of youth; 3. Earth: the philosopher's stone	BBC Four
2013	Alison Woollard	Life Fantastic	1. Where do I come from?; 2. Am I a Mutant?; 3. Could I live forever?	BBC Four
2014	Danielle George	Sparks will fly: How to Hack your Home	1. The light bulb moment; 2. Making contact; 3. A new revolution	BBC Four
2015	Kevin Fong	How to survive in space	1. Lift off!; 2. Life in Orbit; 3. The next frontier	BBC Four
2016	Saiful Islam	Supercharged: Fuelling the future	1. Let there be light!; 2. People Power; 3. Fully charged	BBC Four
2017	Sophie Scott	The Language of Life	1. Say it with Sound; 2. Silent Messages; 3. The Word	BBC Four
2018	Alice Roberts Aoife McLysaght	Who am I?	1. Where Do I Come From?; 2. What Makes Me Human?; 3. What Makes Me, Me?	BBC Four
2019	Hannah Fry	Secrets and Lies: The Hidden Power of Maths	1. How to Get Lucky; 2. How to Bend the Rules; 3. How Can We All Win?	BBC Four
2020	Christopher Jackson Helen Czerski Tara Shine	Planet Earth: A user's guide	1. Earth Engine; 2. Water World; 3. Up in the Air	BBC Four
2021	Jonathan Van-Tam	Going viral: How Covid changed science forever	1. The Invisible Enemy; 2. The Perfect Storm; 3. Fighting Back	BBC Four
2022	Sue Black	Secrets of Forensic Science	1. Dead Body; 2. Missing Body; 3. Living Body	BBC Four
2023	Michael Wooldridge	The Truth about AI	1. How to Build an Intelligent Machine; 2. My AI Life; 3. The Future of AI: Dream or Nightmare?	BBC Four
2024	Chris van Tulleken	The Truth About Food	1. From Tastebuds to Toilet; 2. How Food Makes Us; 3. The Big Food Hack	BBC Four
2025	Maggie Aderin-Pocock	Is There Life Beyond Earth?	1. Destination Moon; 2. Searching the Solar System; 3. To the Stars and Beyond	BBC Four
