= David Phillips (chemist) =

British chemist

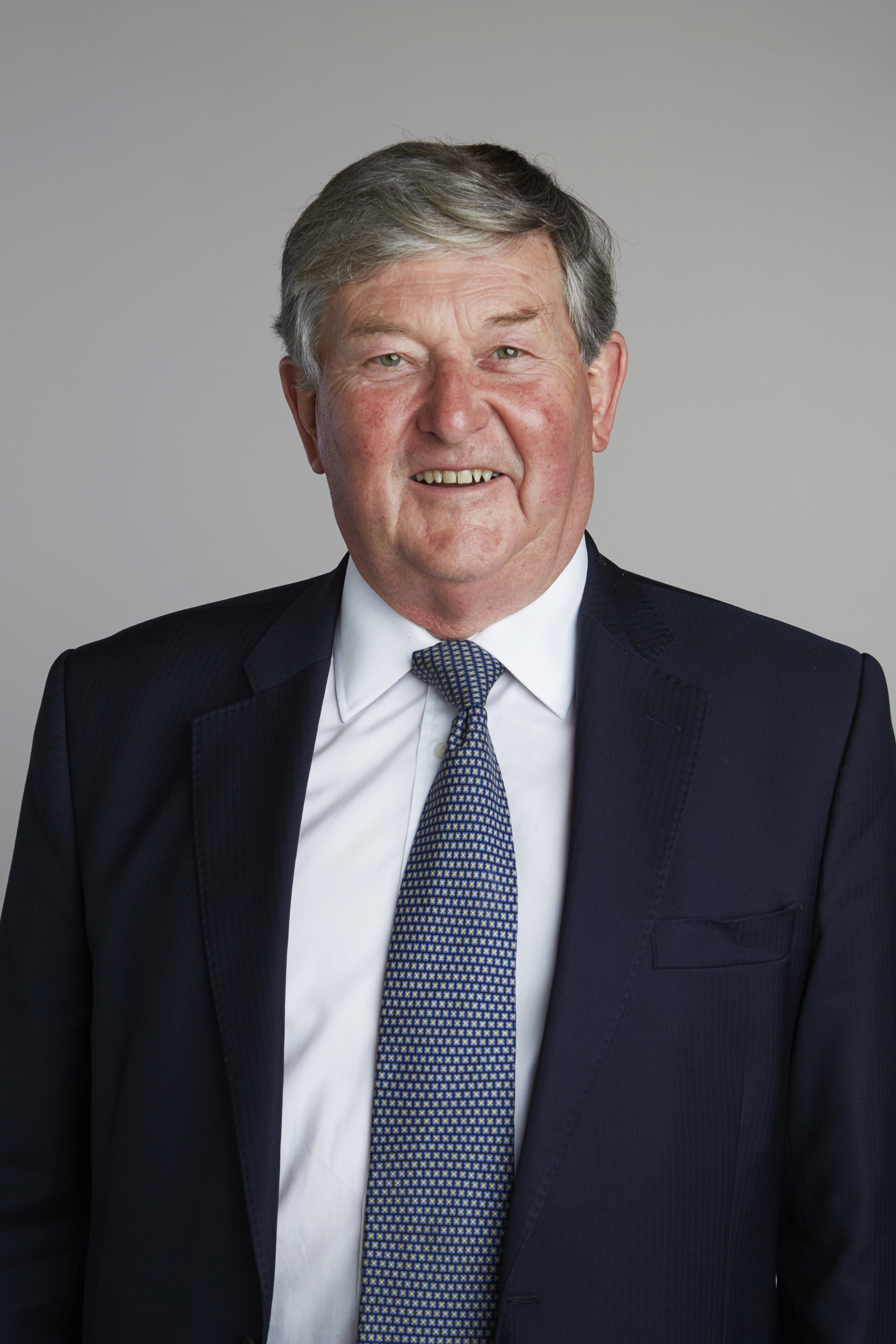
- David Phillips in 2015, portrait via the Royal Society
- Born: 3 December 1939 (age 86)
- Education: University of Birmingham
- Awards: FRS (2015); CBE (2012); OBE (1999)
- Scientific career
- Workplaces: University of Southampton

David Phillips's voice
from the BBC programme Desert Island Discs, 1 May 2011.

David Phillips, CBE, FRSC, FRS (born 3 December 1939) is a British chemist specialising in photochemistry and lasers, and was president of the Royal Society of Chemistry from 2010 to 2012.

== Education and early life ==
Phillips was born 3 December 1939 in Kendal, lived in South Shields and attended the Grammar School. He studied at the University of Birmingham attaining a BSc and PhD.

== Career and research ==
Phillips began his career doing postdoctoral research at the University of Texas at Austin and the Academy of Sciences of the USSR. He was appointed a lecturer in chemistry at the University of Southampton, rising to the status of Reader then becoming Wolfson Professor of Natural Philosophy, at the Royal Institution. In 1981, Phillips became a founding member of the World Cultural Council. In 1989 he moved to Imperial College, London as professor of physical chemistry and held a number of senior posts there. Once when he took the lift in the Chemistry Department, it stopped on every floor. When he got out he said “that lift was quantised!”.

In 1987 he gave the Royal Institution Christmas Lectures on television. He was appointed Officer of the Order of the British Empire (OBE) in 1999 and Commander of the Order of the British Empire (CBE) in the 2012 New Year Honours for services to chemistry. In May 2011 he was the guest on Desert Island Discs and in June 2012 was Michael Berkeley's guest on Private Passions.

=== Views on nuclear power ===
Ahead of the 50th anniversary of the 1962 James Bond film Dr No, Phillips stated that the character of Dr No, with his personal nuclear reactor, helped to create a "remorselessly grim" reputation for atomic energy. and that the popularity of the movie created an enduringly negative image of nuclear power – as something dangerous that could be wielded by megalomaniacs with aspirations to world domination. Phillips claims that when nuclear power is discussed "it is not at all surprising that the public at home and abroad are sceptical" and concludes that "The Royal Society of Chemistry asserts that nuclear power has to be part of the future national energy mix, in which it plays a major role. Fossil fuels have to be eradicated for people to live in a healthy environment. Let's say yes to nuclear and no to Dr No's nonsense."

== Awards and honours ==
Phillips received the Porter Medal in 2010 and was elected a Fellow of the Royal Society (FRS) in 2015.

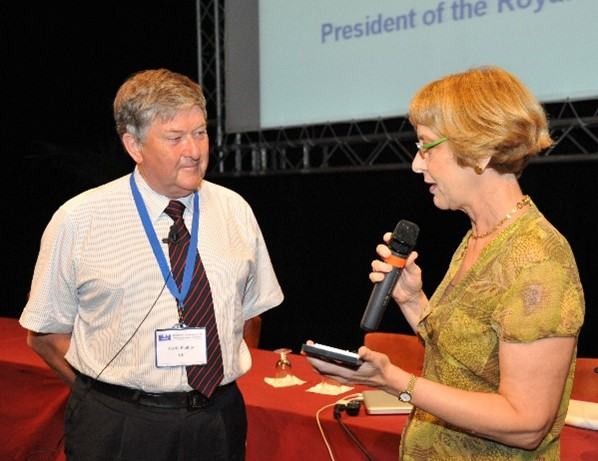
D. Markovitsi, president of the European Photochemistry Association, presents D. Phillips with the Porter Medal at the IUPAC Symposium on Photochemistry at Ferarra
