= David Pye (zoologist) =

John David Pye (born 1932) is a British zoologist who is an Emeritus Professor of Queen Mary, University of London.

Professor Pye is a specialist in animal ultrasound echolocation and light polarisation. He presented the 1985 Royal Institution Christmas Lectures on the theme of "Communicating" and has written the textbook Polarised Light in Science and Nature.
