= Alison Woollard =

British scientist

- Born: Alison Claire S. Woollard; 1968 (age 57–58); Kingston-upon-Thames, Surrey, England
- Education: Birkbeck College, London; University of Oxford
- Scientific career
- Workplaces: University College, London; Birkbeck College, London; Hertford College, Oxford; MRC Laboratory of Molecular Biology
- Thesis: Cell cycle control in fission yeast (1995)
- Doctoral advisor: Paul Nurse
- Website: https://www.bioch.ox.ac.uk/aspsite/index.asp?pageid=606

Alison Woollard (born 1968) is a British biologist. She is a lecturer in the Department of Biochemistry at the University of Oxford where she is also a Fellow of Hertford College, Oxford.

== Early life and education ==
Woollard was born in 1968 in Kingston-upon-Thames.

Woollard was educated at University of London, gaining her undergraduate degree in Biological Sciences in 1991 and gained her Doctor of Philosophy degree at the University of Oxford on fission yeast supervised by Paul Nurse in 1995.

== Academic career ==
Woollard moved to the Laboratory of Molecular Biology in Cambridge in 1995. Her research focuses on developmental biology of the nematode model organism Caenorhabditis elegans particularly RUNX genes.

She is currently the Academic Champion for Public Engagement with Research at the University of Oxford, a post which she has held since 2017.

== Awards and honours ==
In 2013 Woollard presented the Royal Institution Christmas Lectures. She has also been interviewed on the BBC radio programme The Life Scientific.
