= Sue Hartley =

British ecologist

Susan Elaine Hartley OBE is a British ecologist and is vice-president for Research at the University of Sheffield. Previously she was director of the York Environmental Sustainability Institute (YESI) at the University of York and Professor of Ecology at the University of Sussex, specialising in interactions between plants and animals. In December 2009 she delivered the Royal Institution Christmas Lectures on The 300 Million Years War, broadcast on More4.

== Education ==
Sue Hartley attended St Hugh's College, University of Oxford, England, where she undertook an undergraduate BA degree in biochemistry. She then studied for DPhil postgraduate degree at the University of York in field of ecology. Her research considered the defences used by plants against being eaten by insects.

== Career ==
Hartley worked at the Centre for Ecology and Hydrology, located close to Aberdeen in Scotland. Here she researched herbivorous foraging by animals such as red deer and sheep, considering the effect on the moorlands. She moved to the University of Sussex in 2001, where she was a Reader and then Professor in the School of Biological Sciences. At Sussex, Hartley's research group studies how plants defend themselves from being eaten and also how plant responses to herbivores affect other organisms that attack plants. In addition, she researches into interactions between plants and herbivores, including projects on camels and goats overgrazing in the Sinai desert and on the impact of insects consuming tropical tree seedlings in Borneo and Uganda. Hartley was Director of Research and Knowledge Exchange at the University of Sussex. For the European Food Safety Authority and the European Commission, Prof. Hartley has advised on the ecological effect of organisms that have been genetically modified. She has also been President of the British Ecological Society (2016–2017). She is a Trustee of the Royal Botanic Gardens, Kew (2016–present) and is a non-executive board member for Natural England (2018–2021). She was appointed an Officer of the Order of the British Empire in the Queen's Birthday Honours for 2019 for 'services to Ecological Research and Public Engagement'
