= Monica Grady =

British space scientist

Monica Grady CBE
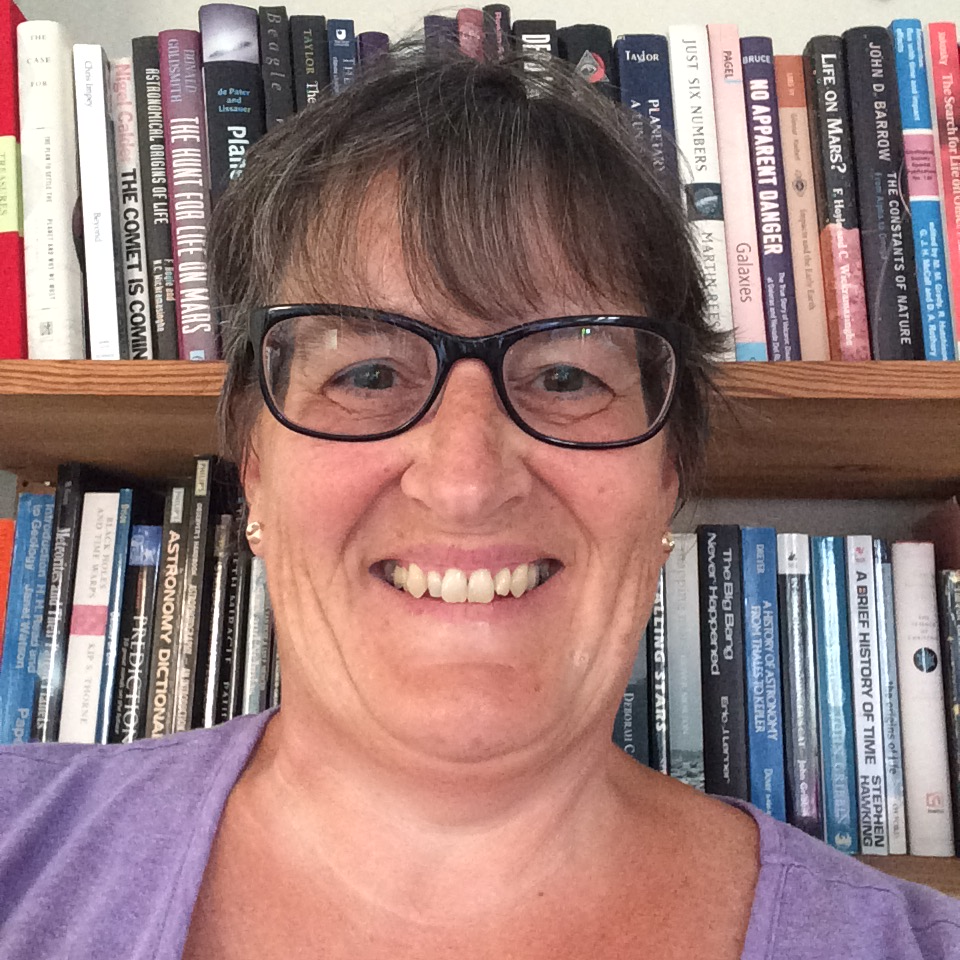
- Born: 15 July 1958 (age 67); Leeds, West Yorkshire, United Kingdom
- Education: St Aidan's College, Durham University (1979); Darwin College, Cambridge (1982)
- Occupations: Professor of Planetary and Space Sciences at the Open University
- Years active: Since 1979
- Known for: Work on meteorites
- Television: Royal Institution Christmas Lectures (2003)
- Monica Grady's voice from the BBC programme The Life Scientific, 16 October 2012.

Monica Mary Grady, CBE (born 15 July 1958) is a British space scientist, primarily known for her work on meteorites. She is currently Professor of Planetary and Space Science at the Open University and is also the Chancellor of Liverpool Hope University.

== Early life ==
Monica Grady is the oldest of eight children and the daughter of teachers. She attended Notre Dame Collegiate School for Girls in Leeds, prior to it becoming Notre Dame Grammar School and then later Notre Dame Catholic Sixth Form College, as a pupil of Form Sherwin.

== Career ==
Grady graduated from the University of Durham in 1979, where she was a student at St Aidan's College then went on to complete a PhD on carbon in stony meteorites at Darwin College, Cambridge in 1982 where she studied under Professor Colin Pillinger and also met her husband.

Grady has formerly been based at the Natural History Museum, where she curated the UK's national collection of meteorites. She has built up an international reputation in meteoritics, publishing many papers on the carbon and nitrogen isotope geochemistry of primitive meteorites, on Martian meteorites, and on interstellar components of meteorites.

Grady was appointed a Fellow of the Meteoritical Society in 2000, a Fellow of the Institute of Physics in 2012 and a Fellow of the Geochemical Society in 2015 (these are honorary appointments, bestowed by the President and Council of each Society, following nomination by peer-scientists). She has been a Fellow of the Royal Astronomical Society since 1990, and a Fellow of the Mineralogical Society of Great Britain and Ireland since 1992. From 2012 to 2013, she was President of the Meteoritical Society. She was awarded the Coke Medal of the Geological Society of London in 2016, for her work in science communication.

Grady gave the Royal Institution Christmas Lectures in 2003, on the subject "A Voyage in Space and Time". Asteroid (4731) was named Monicagrady in her honour.

In 2010, Grady returned to Durham, spending 3 months at St Mary's College as a Fellow of the Institute of Advanced Study Grady was appointed Commander of the Order of the British Empire (CBE) in the 2012 Birthday Honours for services to space sciences.

In 2014, Grady spoke to BBC News about the aims and the significance of the spacecraft Rosetta. Grady said: "The biggest question that we are trying to get an answer to is: where did life on Earth come from?" A video of her highly enthusiastic reaction when Philae successfully landed on the comet was published widely around the internet on many media sources. On 31 July 2015 she appeared on Radio 4's Desert Island Discs.

In July 2019, Grady was awarded an Honorary Doctorate honoris causa by Liverpool Hope University for her work in communication of science and faith; in January 2020, she was installed as its third Chancellor.

Grady is one of the members of Euro-Cares, an EU-funded Horizon2020 project which has the aim of developing a roadmap for a European Sample Curation Facility, designed to curate precious samples returned from Solar System exploration missions to asteroids, Mars, the Moon and comets.

== Personal life ==
Grady is a practising Catholic. Her youngest sister, Dr Ruth Grady, is a Senior Lecturer in microbiology at the University of Manchester. Grady's husband, Professor Ian Wright, is also a planetary scientist at the Open University. Ian was Principal Investigator of the Ptolemy instrument on the Philae lander, part of ESA's Rosetta spacecraft. Ian and Monica have one son, Jack Wright, who works in the film industry.

== Selected bibliography ==
- Grady, Monica (2022), "Meteorites", Catalogue of Meteorites, Natural History Museum, doi:10.5519/TQFUWLE7
- Grady, M. M.; Natural History Museum (2001). Search for life. London: Natural History Museum. ISBN 0-565-09157-3. OCLC 45580827.
- Grady, M. M. (2001). Astrobiology. Washington, D.C.: Smithsonian Institution Press. ISBN 1-56098-849-5. OCLC 44969486.
- Grady, M. M.; Pratesi, Giovanni; Cecchi, Vanni Moggi (2014). Atlas of meteorites. Cambridge, United Kingdom. ISBN 978-0-521-84035-4. OCLC 899233185.
