= Sir Roger Manwood's School =

Location
- Manwood Road; Sandwich, Kent, CT13 9JX; England; 51.2718°N 1.3454°E

Information
- Type: Grammar school; Academy; Boarding school (until 2020)
- Motto: Engage, Explore, Excel.
- Established: 1563; 463 years ago
- Founder: Sir Roger Manwood
- Department for Education URN: 136501 Tables
- Ofsted: Reports
- Headmaster: Benjamin Pennells
- Gender: Co-educational (since 1982); Boys (until 1982)
- Age: 11 to 18
- Enrolment: 1,027
- Houses: Atlas, Carmarthen, Founders, Stour and Ypres (previously Dorman, Knolles, Trappes and Tudor)
- Publication: The Manwoodian
- Alumni: Old Manwoodians
- Website: http://www.manwoods.co.uk/

Sir Roger Manwood's School is a grammar school located in the medieval town of Sandwich, Kent, England. Founded in 1563, it is one of the oldest schools in Britain and the third oldest state grammar school in Kent. Originally an all-boys school, the school became co-educational in 1982 and welcomed boarders until 2020. It now solely operates as a day school.

== History ==
The school was founded in 1563 by Sir Roger Manwood, an eminent barrister, jurist and supporter of the Reformation of the Church in England. Manwood’s intention was to create a free grammar school to make education more accessible to the local townspeople. The original location of the school was at Ash Road in Sandwich but it was moved to its current location at Manwood Road in 1895. There are four foundations which appoint governors: the Lord Warden of the Cinque Ports, Lincoln College, Oxford, Gonville and Caius College, Cambridge and the Diocese of Canterbury.

In 1960 there were 100 boarders. The boarders were separated into two houses; ‘The Grange’ accommodating the girls and ‘The Lodge’ the boys. After a long-running tradition of being an all-boys school, girls were first admitted in 1982. As of September 2020, the school no longer ran their boarding facilities.

The school was reported as being 'Good' in all categories by Ofsted in 2022, dropping from the previous report's 'outstanding'.

== Admissions ==
In order to gain entry the prospective student must first pass the 11+ examination.

Once enrolled, new pupils are assigned a house, which will also be their form group from Years 7 to 9. From Years 10 to 13 pupils from each house are mixed into new forms. Each house is identified by a different colour. The houses and colours are as follows: Atlas House is red, Carmarthen House is orange, Founders' House is green, Stour House is light blue and Ypres House is dark blue, with student ties striped accordingly.

The houses were previously Tudor (light blue), Trappes (dark blue), Knolles (dark green) and Dorman (red).

=== Headteachers ===
- Edward Henry Blakeney, M.A. (Cantab.), (1895–1901)
- Rev. Harold Buchanan Ryley, M.A. (Oxon.), (1901–1905)
- Rev. George Edward Battle, M.A. (Dublin), (1905–1914)
- Rev. William Burton, M.A. (Cantab.), (1914–1935)
- Ephraim Parker Oakes, M.A. (Cantab.), (1935–1960)
- John Frederick Spalding, M.Sci. (London), J.P., (1960–1978)
- Howell Griffiths (1978–1990)
- Ian Mellor (1991–96), then Stockport Grammar School from 1996 to 2005
- Christopher Morgan (1996–2013)
- Lee Hunter (September 2013 – December 2024)
- Benjamin Pennells (January 2025 – Present)

== Combined Cadet Force ==
The school has a Combined Cadet Force (CCF) group with an army section, operating after school on Thursdays. Annual CCF events include an inspection day, a summer camp, and a Founder's Day parade celebrating both the founding of the school and paying homage to Sir Roger Manwood.

== Notable alumni ==
The Old Manwoodians Association is an alumni association for ex-pupils of the school. Old Manwoodians include:

Arts and entertainment

- Johnny Beerling, controller of Radio 1 1985–93 who launched the Radio 1 roadshow and was responsible for broadcasting Live Aid
- Jon Driscoll, an Olivier Award-winning and Tony-nominated theatre projection designer
- Patrick Miles, an English writer and translator
- Christopher Newton, theatre director
- Gale Pedrick, Scriptwriter, author and broadcaster
- Jack Scanlon, child actor and title character in The Boy in the Striped Pyjamas
- Richard Webster, a British author
- Nick Wilton, actor and scriptwriter who has appeared in shows including EastEnders
- Marcus Sedgwick, a British writer and illustrator

Academia

- Dr Ken Riley, Physicist, Senior Tutor at Clare College, Cambridge and Emeritus Lecturer in Physics at Cambridge University.
- Professor John Hartley, Director of the Centre for Culture and Technology at Curtin University in Western Australia and Professor of Journalism, Media and Cultural Studies at Cardiff University.
- Richard Ovenden, Bodley's Librarian at the Bodleian Library

Medicine

- Professor Donald Longmore OBE, who was one of the team that performed the UK's first heart transplant

Engineering

- Hayne Constant, a mechanical and aeronautical engineer who developed jet engines during WWII
- Zoe Laughlin, a British artist, materials engineer and Director of the Institute of Making at University College London

Journalism

- Jonathan Beale, BBC Defence Correspondent since 2017

Sport

- Tammy Beaumont, England international cricketer and world number 1 female batter in 2021
- Melanie Clewlow, England international hockey player
- Eugene Gilkes, Commonwealth athlete representing England at 1986 and 1990 games. Bronze medal winner in 1990.
- Keith Stock, pole-vaulter who competed at the 1984 Olympics

Clergy

- Rt Rev John Kingsmill Cavell, Bishop of Southampton from 1972 to 1984

Politics

- William Brown, Labour MP from 1929 to 1931 for Wolverhampton West and from 1942 to 1950 for Rugby
- Sir Robin Knowles CBE, High Court judge
