= Jwalapuram =

Paleolithic site in Southern India

Coordinates: 15.81°N 78.03°E

Jwalapuram (meaning "City of fire" in Telugu) is an archaeological site in the Nandyal district of Andhra Pradesh, southern India, which shows hominid habitation before and after the Toba event (73 kya) according to the Toba catastrophe theory. It is unclear what species of humans settled Jwalapuram as no fossil remains have yet been found.

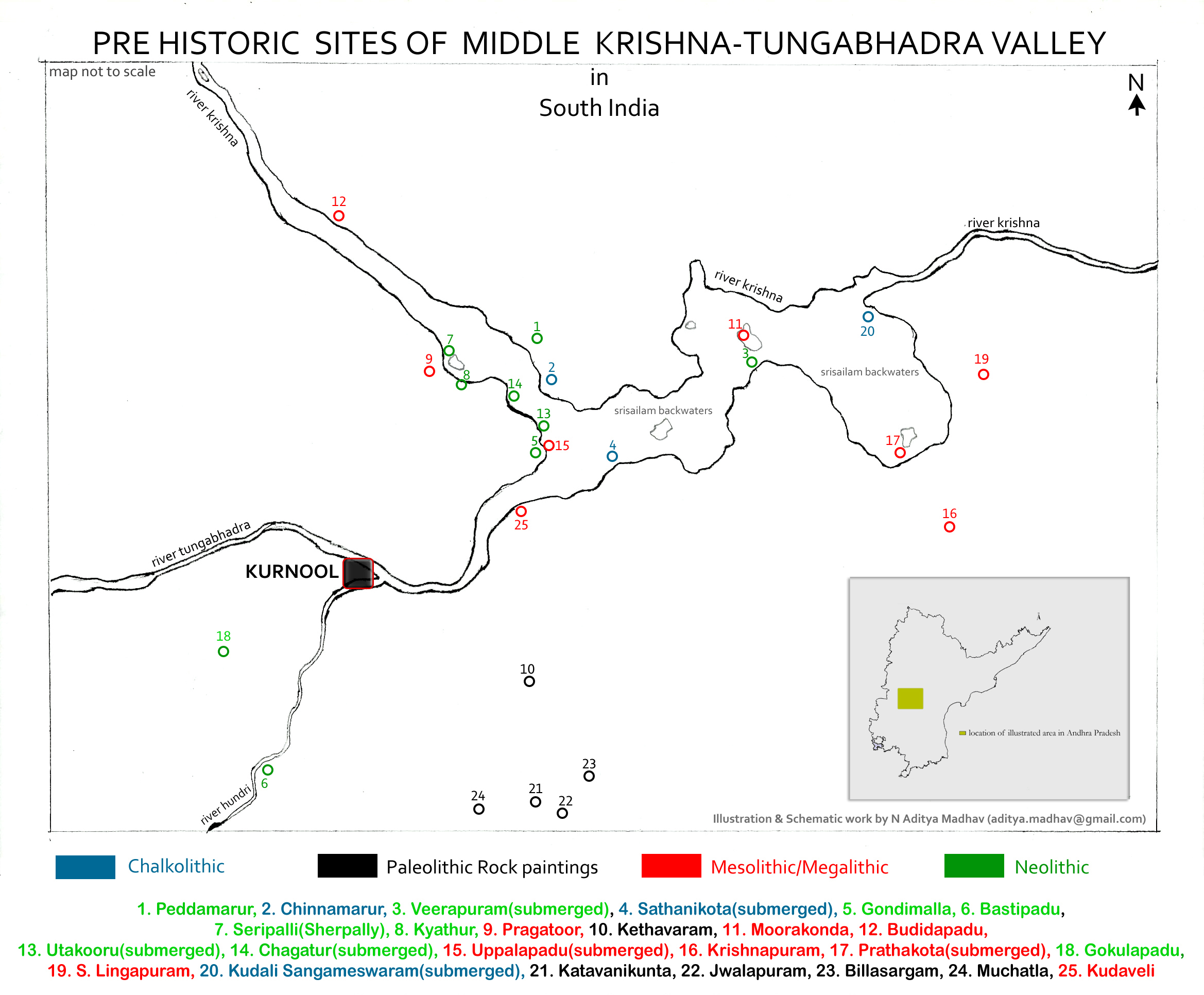
The location of Jwalapuram in context with other prehistoric sites in the region of river valleys of Krishna River and Tungabhadra River.

Jwalapuram is of particular importance in understanding the emergence of microlithic technology in South Asia and the role of environmental change on lithic technological change. At Jwalapuram Locality 9, five stratigraphic units provide a record of technological change through time. Microblade technology dominates lithic assemblages from Stratum E to the top deposit. There are many different definitions for "microblade" and Clarkson et al. define microblade with a 40mm maximum length in the direction of striking and a length:width ratio greater than 2:1; they also include that the dorsal surface has nearly no cortex (less than 20 percent) and at least on dorsal ridge in the direction of striking as well as nearly parallel lateral margins. Using this definition of microblade, Clarkson et al. track the changing density of microblade technology throughout the strata. The changes in microlithic technology is speculated to have been caused by climate change, which made the area more arid and therefore groups of people had to become more mobile, causing changes in their technological tool kits.

The Jwalapuram site was excavated by Prof. Ravi Korisettar. Stone tools under and over layers of volcanic ash left behind by the Toba eruption of 74,000 BC. The volcanic eruption on Sumatra, had impacted life all the way from East Asia to Africa, and has now become an archaeological marker to understand pre-history of India.

The archaeological site was visited by Dr. Alice Roberts, presenter of the BBC documentary The Incredible Human Journey.
