= Patrick Miles =

Patrick Miles may refer to:

- Patrick Miles Jr. (born 1967), former U.S. Attorney for the Western District of Michigan
- Patrick Miles (writer) (born 1948), English writer and translator

== See also ==
- Patrick Myles (fl. 2000s–2010s), Irish actor, filmmaker and producer
