= Hetherington Prize =

- Description: Award for the best doctoral thesis presentation in the Department of Materials
- Country: United Kingdom
- Presented by: Oxford University

The Hetherington Prize has been awarded once a year since 1991 at Oxford University for the best doctoral thesis presentation in the Department of Materials. The first ever prize (1991) was awarded to Prof. Kwang-Leong Choy (D.Phil., DSc, FIMMM, FRSC, CSci), who went on to become the Director of the Institute for Materials Discovery at University College London and Fellow of the Royal Society of Canada.

The award is almost exclusively awarded to only one doctoral candidate per year, but in two years it was shared (in 2011 to Nike Dattani and Lewys Jones, and in 2015 to Nina Klein, Aaron Lau, and Joe O'Gorman).

== List of notable winners of the Hetherington Prize ==
| Name | Year | Later appointments | Other awards | Refs |
|---|---|---|---|---|
| Prof. Kwang Leong Choy | 1991 | Director of the Institute for Materials Discovery at University College London | Fellow of the Royal Society of Canada, Fellow of the Institute of Materials, Minerals and Mining (FIMMM) | |
| Prof. Tchavdar Todorov | 1992 | Professor at Queen's University Belfast | | |
| Dr. Lii-Yun Su | 1993 | Deputy CEO of Hi-P International Limited, Vice President & Managing Director of Elementis | | |
| Prof. Mark Miodownik | 1995 | Head of Materials Research Group at King's College London, Co-founder of the Materials Library | Order of the British Empire (MBE, 2018), Morgan-Botti lecture (2013), Royal Institution Christmas Lectures (2014), Michael Faraday Prize (2017) | |
| Prof. Marina Galano | 2003 | Professor at Oxford University, Lecturer at Queen's College, Oxford, Fellow of Mansfield College, Oxford | EPSRC Research Fellow, RAEng (Royal Academy of Engineering) | |
| Prof. Dave Armstrong | 2007 | Professor at Oxford University, Fellow of Corpus Christi College, Oxford | Royal Academy of Engineering Research Fellow | |
| Prof. Lau Khim Heng | 2008 | Professor at Monash University | | |
| Dr. Katie Moore | 2009 | Senior Lecturer at Manchester University | The Rank Prize Funds Nutrition Committee Prize (2016), IOM3 Young Person's Lecture Competition (Winner in UK, and 3rd place in the World, 2010) | |
| Dr. Nike Dattani | 2011 | Researcher at Harvard University | Banting Award (2016), Clarendon Award (2009) | |
| Prof. Lewys Jones | 2011 | Ussher Professor of Ultramicroscopy at Trinity College Dublin | Fellow of the Royal Microscopical Society (2015) | |
