= Origins of Us =

Origins of Us is a British television series documentary series shown on BBC Two. It is about human evolution and is presented by Alice Roberts.

It consists of three episodes, each an hour long.

- Episode 1: air date 17 October 2011 – Bones
- Episode 2: air date 24 October 2011 – Guts
- Episode 3: air date 31 October 2011 – Brains

== See also ==
- Dawn of Humanity (2015 PBS documentary)
- Prehistoric Autopsy (2012 BBC documentary)
- The Incredible Human Journey (2009 BBC documentary)
