= Sensoaesthetics =

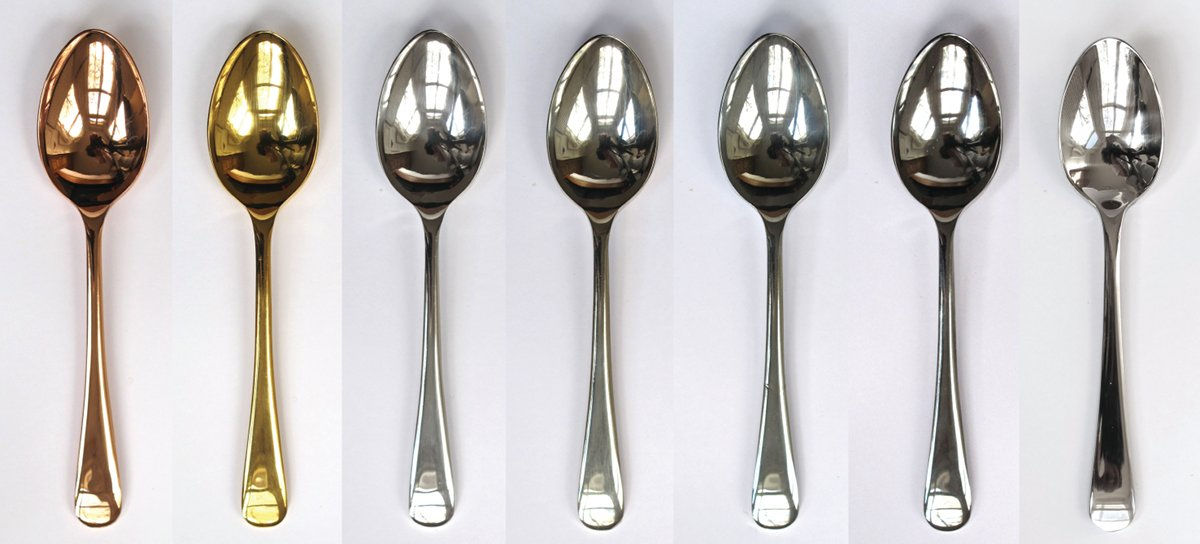
Copper, gold, silver, tin, zinc, chrome and stainless steel spoons, by Zoe Laughlin.

Sensoaesthetics is the application of scientific methods to the study of the aesthetic, sensual and emotional aspects of materials.

== Overview ==
The purpose of Sensoaesthetics is to understand how people interact with materials, and use that understanding to improve design and incorporate multisensory integration into the process. Another priority of Sensoaesthetics is to connect the Materials Science community with other disciplines such as Art and the design world, and reverse a perceived eradication of interest in the sensual and aesthetic properties of materials. The field has been developed by Materials Science academics, Professor Mark Miodownik and Dr Zoe Laughlin at King's College London and UCL, and through the work of the Materials Library at King's College, and the Institute of Making.

== Spoon Experiment ==
The event was held in May, 2012 at Quilon, a Michelin starred Indian restaurant in London, by Zoe Laughlin and Mark Miodownik. The purpose was to study the taste of solid metals, and involved inviting a group of people including chef Heston Blumenthal and food science writer Harold McGee to eat Indian food using seven different freshly polished spoons in copper, gold, silver, tin, zinc, chrome and stainless steel.

The tastes of copper and zinc were found to be "bold and assertive, with bitter, metallic tastes". The silver spoon "tasted dull", while the stainless steel had a "faintly metallic flavour". Miodownik observed that the guests were not just tasting the spoons, but eating them, as with every lick they consumed "perhaps a hundred billion atoms".

In 2016, a set of the spoons Laughlin designed were included in the new permanent collection of London's Design Museum and are on display in the Designer Maker User gallery.

== See also ==
- Neuroaesthetics
- Aesthetics
