= Stuff Matters =

2014 nonfiction book by Mark Miodownik

Stuff Matters: Exploring the Marvelous Materials That Shape Our Man-Made World
- Front cover
- Author: Mark Miodownik
- Language: English
- Subject: Materials science
- Publisher: Houghton Mifflin Harcourt
- Publication date: 2014
- Publication place: United States
- Media type: Print, e-book, audiobook
- Pages: 252 pages
- ISBN: 978-0-544-23604-2

Stuff Matters: Exploring the Marvelous Materials That Shape Our Man-Made World is a 2014 non-fiction book by the British materials scientist Mark Miodownik. The book explores many of the common materials people encounter during their daily lives and seeks to explain the science behind them in an accessible manner. Miodownik devotes a chapter each to ten such materials, discussing their scientific qualities alongside quirky facts and anecdotes about their impacts on human history. Called "a hugely enjoyable marriage of science and art", Stuff Matters was critically and commercially successful, becoming a New York Times best seller and a winner of the Royal Society Prize for Science Books.

== Background ==
Miodownik was working at University College London as a professor of materials and society at the time the book was published. He first gained interest in his field of study during his teenage years following an attempted robbery while on the subway. He was stabbed with a razor through multiple layers of clothing, leading him to be curious about the qualities of steel that provided for such a sharp and strong edge. The author would go on to earn a doctorate in jet engine alloys before entering into academic work. He was an occasional presenter on instructional television programs, and the year after publishing Stuff Matters he was the recipient of the American Association for the Advancement of Science's Public Engagement with Science Award. Stuff Matters was the author's first published popular science work.

== Synopsis ==
Each of the book's chapters begins with the same photograph of Miodownik sitting on the rooftop of his London apartment. In each iteration of the photo, a different object is circled – a teacup in one chapter, a flowerpot in another, and so on – with that chapter focused on the history and science of the material of which the highlighted item consists. Over the course of the book, Miodownik covers a number of materials that have been around for a long time (steel, paper, glass, porcelain), some introduced last century (concrete, plastics, carbon fiber), and a few relatively new inventions (graphene, aerogels). He includes a chapter on chocolate due in large part to his own obsession with the sweet. Miodownik seeks to draw connections from the materials to the lives of the people who use them, saying, "The material world is not just a display of our technology and culture, it is part of us. We invented it, we made it, and in turn, it makes us who we are."

The author takes varying approaches to explaining each material's attributes and their importance, since according to him, the "materials and our relationships with them are too diverse for a single approach to suit them all". In the process of describing the book's subjects he intersperses scientific knowledge with insights into the materials' impacts on human history. For instance, historically the Chinese had a technological edge over the rest of the world in many respects (they alone held the secret to making porcelain for hundreds of years, for one example). However, their culture preferred other materials over glass, and Miodownik surmises that the resulting lack of advancement with that substance later held the culture back scientifically, as glass is a key component in such tools as microscopes and telescopes. Elsewhere, the author describes how the sudden 19th-century surge in popularity of billiards can be linked to the invention of both nylon and vinyl, as the need for a cheap alternative to ivory for making pool balls led to the increased development of celluloid, the success of which led to further innovation in plastics.

While much of the book relates the history of the selected materials, Miodownik also devotes time to many of their futures, including the development of a type of concrete that is infused with bacteria meant to self-repair cracks as they occur. Also described are aerogels, which are ultralight materials that are the best thermal insulators known to man. Composed of over 99% air, these materials are able to produce Rayleigh scattering in much the same way as the Earth's atmosphere, thereby appearing blue to the naked eye. This effect, combined with the aerogel's light weight, leads Miodownik to say that holding a sample is "like holding a piece of sky". The material is extremely expensive to make, however, and outside of occasional specific applications for NASA (it was a key component of that agency's Stardust mission), practical uses have been difficult to find.

Miodownik writes that civilization is built on the materials around us, and that we acknowledge their importance by naming our historical eras after them. The Stone, Bronze, and Iron Ages are well known, and Miodownik argues that the steel age likely began in the late 19th century and we could be considered to be currently living in the silicon age. The constant desire for improvements in our lives (improved comfort, improved safety, etc.) drives the constant improvements to the materials that comprise our world. Therefore, Miodownik concludes, materials are "a multi-scale expression of our human needs and desires".

== Reception ==
Stuff Matters was a New York Times best seller and won the 2014 Royal Society Prize for Science Books as well as the 2015 National Academies Communication Award. The book released to generally positive reviews. Writing for The New York Times Book Review, Rose George praised Miodownik's blend of science and storytelling. The Wall Street Journal called it a "thrilling account of the modern material world", while The Independent was impressed with the "learned, elegant discourse" Miodownik conducts in each chapter. The Observer's Robin McKie considered the book "deftly written" and appreciated the author's conclusions drawn from the historical record. The reviewer for the Financial Times enjoyed the book but was critical of the occasional error, as when Miodownik mistakenly identifies the Greek word for chocolate as being much older than it is.

The reviewer for Entertainment Weekly wrote that Miodownik occasionally lapsed into technical speak in a book meant for a broader audience, but that the author's clear enthusiasm for his subject outweighed any such negative aspects. Science News considered Miodownik's explanations of the more science-intensive material to be accessible and praised the humor interspersed throughout the book. Stuff Matters was well received by certain trade journals as well. The American Ceramic Society Bulletin wrote that Miodownik's writing worked both as an introduction to the layperson as well as a "reminder of the field's broad purpose" for those with more knowledge on the subject, while the journal of the Boston Society of Architects particularly enjoyed the book's chapter on concrete. Bill Gates reviewed the book favorably on his website, writing, "In political contests, voters sometimes put more weight on whether they'd like to have a beer with a candidate than on the candidate's qualifications. Miodownik would pass anyone's beer test, and he has serious qualifications."
