= Prehistoric Autopsy =

- Film cover
- Genre: Documentary film
- Directed by: Natalie Humphreys (creative director)
- Narrated by: George McGavin; Alice Roberts
- Country of origin: United Kingdom
- Original language: English
- No. of episodes: Three one-hour episodes

Production
- Executive producer: Jane Aldous
- Producer: Graeme Thomson
- Cinematography: Vic Kusin; Phil Piotrowsky
- Editors: Paul Conti; John Steventon; John Wilson
- Running time: 3 h (180 min)
- Production company: BBC

Original release
- Network: BBC
- Release: 22 October – 24 October 2012

Prehistoric Autopsy is a 2012 British television documentary film series shown in three one-hour episodes on BBC Two. The series is about human evolution and is narrated by biologist George McGavin and anatomist Alice Roberts. Graeme Thomson is the series producer and Jane Aldous is the executive producer.

== Episodes ==
No.	Title	Original release date
1	"Neanderthal"	22 October 2012
Neanderthal hominids were a species of archaic humans in the genus Homo that date possibly to 600,000 years ago, but more likely to 250,000 years ago, and went extinct about 40,000 years ago. This episode presents an attempt to reconstruct the way Neanderthals looked, based on available fossil evidence, especially those related to 70,000 year-old La Ferrassie 1.
2	"Homo erectus"	23 October 2012
Homo erectus hominids were a species of extinct humans in the genus Homo that dates to 1.9 million years ago and went extinct as recently as 35,000 years ago. This episode presents an attempt to reconstruct the way Homo erectus looked, based on available fossil evidence, especially those related to 1.6 million-year-old Nariokotome Boy.
3	"Lucy"	24 October 2012
Lucy is an example of Australopithecus afarensis, a hominin in the genus Australopithecus that dates to 3.9 million years ago and went extinct about 2.9 million years ago. This episode presents an attempt to reconstruct the way Australopithecus afarensis looked, based on available fossil evidence, especially those related to 3.2 million-year-old Lucy.

== Participants ==
The documentary film series is narrated by George McGavin and Alice Roberts and includes the following participants (alphabetized by last name):

- Zeresenay Alemseged (California Academy of Sciences)
- Anna Barney (University of Southampton)
- Barbara Boucher (Queen Mary University of London)
- Bruce Bradley (Exeter University)
- Rachel Carmody (evolutionary biologist)
- Paul Constantino (Marshall University)
- Robin Crompton (University of Liverpool)
- Viktor Deak (paleoartist)
- Marco de la Rasilla
- Peter de Menocal (Columbia University)
- Jez Harris
- John D. Hawks (University of Wisconsin)
- Donald Carl Johanson
- David Lordkipanidze (Georgian National Museum)
- Gabriele Macho (Powell-Cotton Museum)
- Sandra Martelli (University College London)
- George McGavin (narrator and biologist)
- Jerome Micheletta (University of Portsmouth)
- Alice Roberts (narrator and anatomist)
- Antonio Rosas Gonzalez
- Karen Rosenberg (University of Delaware)
- Danielle Schreve (Royal Holloway, University of London)
- Michael Schultz (University of Göttingen)
- Colin Shaw (University of Cambridge)
- Scott Simpson (Case Western Reserve University)
- Anne Skinner (Williams College)
- Tanya Smith (Harvard University)
- Paul Tafforeau (European Synchrotron Radiation Facility)
- Bridget Waller (University of Portsmouth)
- Carol Ward (University of Missouri)
- Peter Wheeler (Liverpool John Moores University)
- Joao Zilhao (University of Barcelona)

== See also ==
- Dawn of Humanity (2015 PBS documentary film)
- Origins of Us (2011 BBC documentary film)
- The Incredible Human Journey (2009 BBC documentary film)
