= Cambridge Chekhov Company =

Student production of Chekhov's Ivanov

The Cambridge Chekhov Company originated in a student production of Chekhov's Ivanov translated by Patrick Miles and directed by Laurence Brockliss and Patrick Miles at the ADC Theatre, Cambridge, 19–23 February 1974. It was presented by the Shadwell Society of Gonville & Caius College.

In the summer of 1974, the cast and production team were constituted as the Cambridge Young Chekhov Company (CYCC).

== Performance history ==
The CYCC performed Ivanov at Hutton Rudby, North Yorkshire, on 24 August 1974, then went on to the Edinburgh Festival Fringe, where it performed Happiness!, a late-night programme of four Chekhov vaudevilles and British premieres of three stage adaptations of early stories. The production was directed by Laurence Brockliss and Patrick Miles and ran from 27 August to 7 September at Nicolson Square Theatre. In its last week, it was preceded by performances of Ivanov.

On their return to Cambridge, the CYCC performed Happiness! at the ADC Theatre from 29 October to 2 November.

In 1975 the company rehearsed The Cherry Orchard in a translation by Patrick Miles, who also directed. The production focussed on the play's comedy. Members performed The Most Absolute Freedom, a late-night entertainment about the young Chekhov, at the ADC Theatre, Cambridge, 21–25 July 1975. The Cherry Orchard was performed in the Cambridge Festival at the ADC Theatre 4–9 August 1975, then at Nicolson Square Theatre, Edinburgh, 24 August-6 September 1975. Ranevskaia was played by Mavis Mitchell, Gaev by Neil Coulbeck, Lopakhin by Julian Scopes, and Trofimov by Vivian Bickford-Smith.

During the Edinburgh tour, the CYCC performed Patrick Miles's farce Rabbits in a double bill with Chekhov's The Proposal. Members of the Company directed their own productions of Lady Audley's Secret, Lorca by Neil Coulbeck, and Lorca's The Love of Don Perlimplín and Belisa in the Garden. The CYCC also presented the Misfit Theatre in Geoff Nicholson's rock revue Short [But Not So] Suite.

Returning to Cambridge, the company was renamed The Cambridge Chekhov Company (CCC), Patrick Miles was appointed artistic director, and several members became professional actors.

The CCC presented Short [But Not So] Suite at the ADC Theatre 21–25 October 1975.

In 1976 the CCC presented Geoff Nicholson's Amateur Traumatics and Oscar at the Cambridge and Edinburgh Festivals, and members of the CCC performed The Most Absolute Freedom at the Lace Market Theatre, Nottingham.

== Contributions ==
The CCC subsequently gave financial support to the following productions by other companies:

- A Lesson from Aloes, by Athol Fugard, A.D.C. Theatre, 27 April-1 May 1982.
- Petersburg, by Andrei Belyi, St Paul's Church Hammersmith, 8-11, 17-23, 28-29 September 1993.
- Sara, by Patrick Miles after Chekhov, the Bridewell Theatre, 10 February-6 March 1999.
