= The Incredible Human Journey =

British science documentary television series

- Title card
- Genre: Documentary
- Presented by: Alice Roberts
- Theme music composer: Ty Unwin
- Country of origin: United Kingdom
- Original language: English
- No. of series: 1
- No. of episodes: 5

Production
- Executive producer: Kim Shillinglaw
- Producer: Paul Bradshaw
- Running time: 300 minutes (five episodes of 60 mins each)
- Production company: BBC

Original release
- Network: BBC Two
- Release: 10 May – 14 June 2009

The Incredible Human Journey is a five-episode, 300-minute, science documentary film presented by Alice Roberts, based on her book by the same name. The film was first broadcast on BBC television in May and June 2009 in the UK. It explains the evidence for the theory of early human migrations out of Africa and subsequently around the world, supporting the Out of Africa Theory. This theory claims that all modern humans are descended from anatomically modern African Homo sapiens rather than from the more archaic European and Middle Eastern Homo neanderthalensis or the indigenous Chinese Homo pekinensis.

Each episode concerns a different continent, and the series features scenes filmed on location in each of the continents featured. The first episode aired on BBC Two on Sunday 10 May 2009.

== Synopsis ==
=== 1. Out of Africa ===
In the first episode, Roberts introduces the idea that genetic analysis suggests that all modern humans are descended from Africans. She visits the site of the Omo remains in Ethiopia, which are the earliest known anatomically modern humans. She visits the San people of Namibia to demonstrate the hunter-gatherer lifestyle. In South Africa, she visits Pinnacle Point, to see the cave in which very early humans lived. She then explains that genetics suggests that all non-Africans may descend from a single, small group of Africans who left the continent tens of thousands of years ago. She explores various theories as to the route they took. She describes the Jebel Qafzeh remains in Israel as a likely dead end from a crossing of Suez, and sees a route across the Red Sea and around the Arabian coast as the more probable route for modern human ancestors, especially given the lower sea levels of the past.

=== 2. Asia ===
In the second episode, Roberts travels to Siberia and visits an isolated community of indigenous people who still practice reindeer hunting. With reference to them, she asks how ancient Africans could have adapted to the hostile climate of northern Asia, and why Asian people look so different from Africans.

Roberts then explores an alternative to the Out of Africa theory, the multiregional hypothesis that has gained support in some scientific communities in China. According to this theory, the Chinese are descended from a human species called Homo erectus rather than from the Homo sapiens from which the rest of humanity evolved. Roberts visits the Zhoukoudian caves, in which Peking Man, the supposed Homo erectus ancestor of the Chinese, was discovered. Roberts notes that some Chinese anthropologists and palaeontologists have shown modern Chinese physical characteristics in the fossil skulls, such as broad cheek bones, cranial skull shape and shovel-shaped incisors that are absent in almost all other humans. She also notes that the stone tools found in China seem more primitive than those elsewhere, and infers that they were made exclusively by Homo erectus. However, she argues that the skull evidence is only subtle. She interviews an American palaeontologist, who presents his hypothesis that the ancient Chinese humans used bamboo instead of stone, explaining the absence of sophisticated stone tools, despite the absence of archaeological evidence to support this hypothesis. Finally, Roberts interviews Chinese geneticist Jin Li, who ran a study of more than 10,000 individuals scattered throughout China from 160 ethnic groups. The study initially hypothesised that the modern Chinese population evolved from Homo erectus in China but concluded that the Chinese people did in fact evolve and migrate from Africa like the rest of world's population.

=== 3. Europe ===
In the third episode, Roberts describes the various waves of anatomically modern humans that settled the continent of Europe. She crosses the Bosphorus and travels up the Danube River, following their likely route. She then describes the already resident population of Neanderthals, and visits Gibraltar, the last known site occupied by Neanderthals. She suggests that the principal difference between them and Homo sapiens was the latter's ability to create art, and visits the cave paintings at Lascaux. She discusses the theories about why Europeans have white skin and describes the birth of agriculture and the societal changes that took place as a result, visiting the spectacular Neolithic temple at Göbekli Tepe, in southeastern Turkey.

=== 4. Australia ===
In the fourth episode, Roberts discusses the evidence of the Mungo Lake remains, which suggest, unexpectedly, that humans reached Australia long before they reached Europe, even though Australia is further away from Africa. Roberts attempts to trace the journey. She visits a site at Jwalapuram in India that appears to indicate that humans were present there 70,000 years ago, before the Toba supervolcano deposited ash on the site. She then points to the Negrito Semang people of Southeast Asia, who look different from other Asian peoples, and who may be descendants of the peoples who first left Africa. She describes the discovery of the tiny Homo floresiensis on Flores and suggests that they may have been exterminated by modern humans. She describes the crossing of the Torres Strait by experimenting with a bamboo raft. She concludes by visiting a tribe in Northern Australia whose mythology describes their mother goddess arriving from across the sea.

=== 5. The Americas ===
In the final episode, Roberts describes theories about how humans traversed from Asia to the Americas, asking how they achieved it during the Ice Age, when the route to North America was blocked by ice walls. She describes the traditional theory that the first Americans were the Clovis culture, who arrived through an ice-free corridor towards the end of the Ice Age 13,000 years ago. However, she then visits archaeological sites in Texas, Brazil, the Californian Channel Islands and Monte Verde in southern Chile, which show 14,000-year-old human remains, proving that humans must have arrived earlier by a different route. She shows the skull of the Luzia Woman, found in Brazil, which displays Australasian features rather than the East Asian features of modern Native Americans; an archaeologist explains that these first Americans may have been Asians who migrated before Asians developed their distinctive facial features. Roberts shows that the earliest Americans may have migrated down the relatively ice-free western coastlines of North and South America. She concludes by noting that, when Europeans arrived in 1492, they did not recognize Native Americans as fully human, but that modern genetics and archaeology proves that we all ultimately descend from Africans.

== Episodes ==
Episode	Episode title	Airdate	Viewers
1	"Out of Africa"	10 May 2009	2.22m (9.7%)
2	"Asia"	17 May 2009	2.34m (10.2%)
3	"Europe"	24 May 2009	1.66m (7.2%)
4	"Australia"	31 May 2009	2.11m (9.9%)
5	"The Americas"	14 June 2009	1.86m (8.7%)

(No episode was broadcast on 7 June 2009, which was occupied largely by coverage of the European Parliament election results.)

== International broadcast ==
Overseas, this programme was titled Human Journey and edited down to 51-minute episodes without Roberts' scenes or narration. Instead, voice-work was provided by the BBC's Tessa Wojtczak.

- In Australia, this programme aired on ABC1 each Thursday at 8:30 p.m. from 11 March 2010. It has since been repeated in HD on BBC Knowledge.
- In Canada, this programme screened on CBC News Network each Wednesday at 10 p.m. E/P in The Passionate Eye timeslot from 13 October 2010.

== Merchandise ==
The Region 2 DVD was released on 8 June 2009.

The Region 4 DVD was released on 24 March 2010 (original UK broadcast episodes).

The Region 1 DVD was released on 24 August 2010 (original UK broadcast episodes).

The book accompanying the television series is: Roberts, Alice (2009). The Incredible Human Journey. Bloomsbury Publishing. ISBN 978-0-7475-9839-8.

== See also ==
- Andrew Marr's History of the World
- Dawn of Humanity (2015 PBS documentary)
- Origins of Us (2011 BBC documentary)
- Prehistoric Autopsy (2012 BBC documentary)
