= Ice Age Giants =

- Genre: Nature documentary
- Presented by: Alice Roberts
- Composer: David Mitcham
- Country of origin: United Kingdom
- Original language: English
- No. of episodes: 3

Production
- Running time: 60 minutes
- Production companies: BBC Natural History Unit; Discovery Channel; Terra Mater Factual Studios; France Télévisions

Original release
- Network: BBC Two; BBC Two HD
- Release: 19 May – 2 June 2013

Ice Age Giants is a British television documentary series created and produced by BBC Natural History Unit, first shown in the UK on BBC Two and BBC Two HD on 19 May 2013. The series steps back to 20,000 years in time and follows the trail of the prehistoric mammals in the ice age on North America and European region that lived through it to life by using the latest scientific knowledge and a little graphic wizardry.

The series was presented by Dr. Alice Roberts and composed by David Mitcham.

== Broadcast ==
=== British television ===
Ice Age Giants debuted on British television on 19 May 2013, broadcast on BBC Two and BBC Two HD, which consisted of total three episodes.

=== International ===
The series premiered in Australia on Animal Planet on 24 June 2015.

== Episodes ==
No.	Title	Produced by	Original release date
1	"Land of the Sabre-tooth"	Mark Flowers	19 May 2013
The Ice Age odyssey begins in the 'land of the sabre-tooth' in North America, a continent that was covered by ice up to two miles thick in some parts. Yet this frozen land boasted the most impressive cast of Ice Age giants in the world.
2	"Land of the Cave-Bear"	Tim Walker	26 May 2013
The Land of the Cave bear ventures into the areas of the world affected the most by the Ice age – Europe and Siberia. In the mountains of Transylvania, Professor Alice Roberts and her team investigate a cave sealed for thousands of years which shows evidence of a fight to the death between two ice age giants, a cave bear and a cave lion. Animals that would have dwarfed their modern day relatives. Also documented is the woolly mammoth's battle for survival against the Neanderthals, the latter of whom would be outcompeted and eventually driven to extinction by modern humans.
3	"Last of the Giants"	Mark Flowers	2 June 2013
Despite thousands of years of ice covering the northern hemisphere, many of the great giants of the ice age still walked the earth. Episode three looks at what could have caused mammoths, woolly rhinoceros, sabre-toothed cats, giant ground sloths, mastodons and glyptodonts to finally go extinct.

== Home release ==
In United States and Canada (Region 1), a single DVD was released by BBC Warner on 13 January 2015.

As for Australia and New Zealand (Region 4), it was released by ABC DVD/Village Roadshow on 6 August 2014.

== See also ==
- Wild New World
- Planet Earth
- The Blue Planet
- Frozen Planet
