= Zoe Laughlin =

British artist

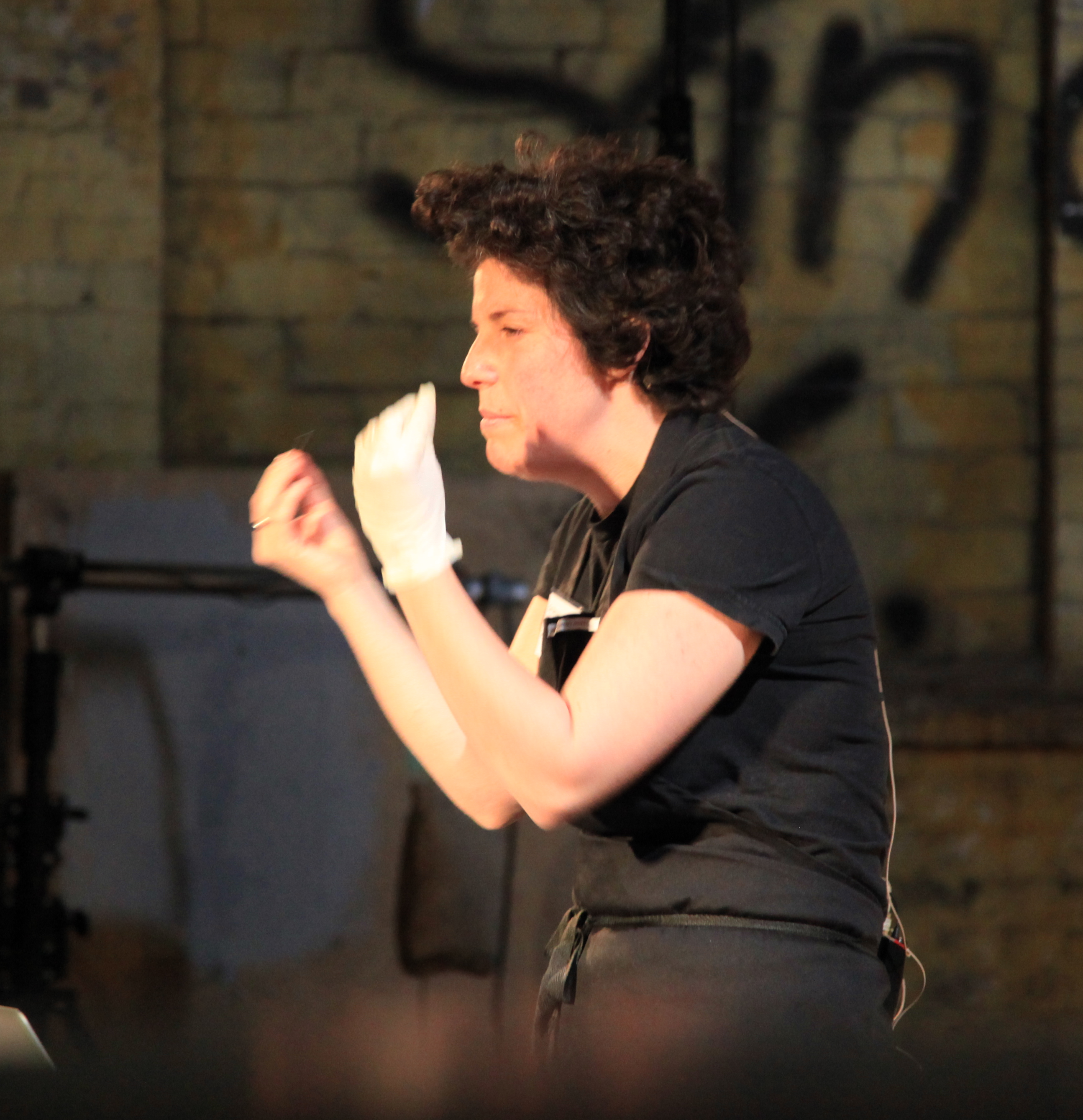
- Zoe Laughlin in 2011
- Education: King's College London; Central Saint Martins; Aberystwyth University; Kent Institute of Art and Design
- Organizations: Institute of Making; University College London
- Known for: Making, art, materials science and engineering
- Website: http://zoelaughlin.com/

Zoe Laughlin (/ˈlɑːflɪn/) is a British artist, maker and materials engineer. She is the co-founder and Director of the Institute of Making at University College London. She is a regular panelist on the BBC Radio 4 show The Kitchen Cabinet. Laughlin was awarded the 2019 Inspire, Support Achieve Award for Design Engineering from the Institution of Engineering Designers.

== Education ==
Laughlin took A-Levels in Art, Textiles and English Literature and completed a Master of Art at Central Saint Martin's College of Art and Design. She earned a PhD in Material Science in the Department of Engineering at King's College London in 2010.

== Research ==
During her PhD, Laughlin discovered how materials affects the taste of food, and how to predict the taste of food using electrode potential. Her thesis, "Beyond the Swatch: How can the Science of Materials be Represented by the Materials Themselves in a Materials Library?", became the basis for the methodological approaches of the Institute of Making and some of its research. The experiments Laughlin undertook were designed to identify the links between the physical properties of materials and our aesthetic perception of materiality. As a result, she has been key to the development of the concept of Sensoaesthetics, which is the "application of scientific methodology to the aesthetic, sensual and emotional side" of materials.

== Career ==
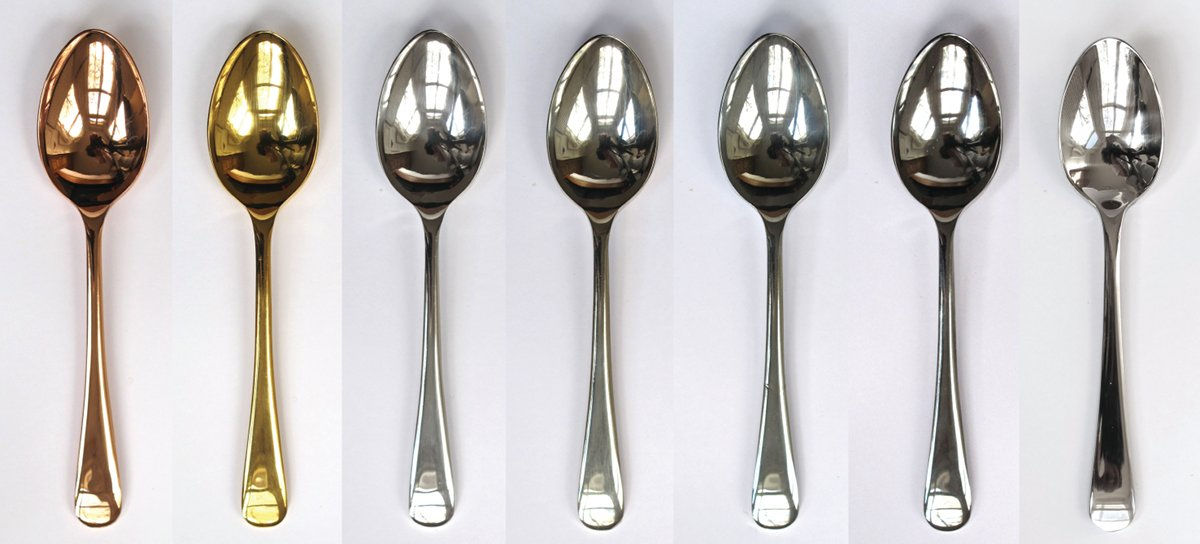
Copper, gold, silver, tin, zinc, chrome and stainless steel sensoaesthetic tasting spoons by Zoe Laughlin

In 2010/11, Mark Miodownik, Martin Conreen and Laughlin began working on the Institute of Making, which they planned to open in the east wing of Somerset House. In February 2012, they joined University College London, and launched "A Taste of Materials" in April 2012. She published Material Matters: New Materials in Design with Black Dog Publishing. Their Materials Library and Make Space opened in Malet Place on 14 March 2013.

Laughlin has created work and done projects with partners and galleries including Tate Modern, the Hayward Gallery, the Victoria and Albert Museum and the Wellcome Collection. In 2016 her spoons became part of the new permanent collection of London's Design Museum and are on display in the Designer Maker User gallery.

Laughlin is interested in the sound of and taste of materials, as well as what she terms "the performativity of matter". She regularly speaks about materials and performs demonstration lectures. In 2012 she delivered a TEDx talk in Brussels on "The Performativity of Matter".

She is a trustee of the Crafts Council, and works with them to integrate new materials and making methods into the crafts sector. Laughlin was honoured by the Institution of Engineering Designers for her "outstanding contributions to design engineering".

Laughlin produces and hosts the podcast The Things that Make Us. She appears regularly on British radio and television, and gives invited talks on material science in Britain and around the world. She has appeared on the Today Programme and "The Material Word" with Quentin Cooper. In 2016, Laughlin delivered an invited talk at The Royal Institution, "Performing Matter: Greatest Hits and New Findings".

== Broadcasting ==
=== This Morning ===
Laughlin was the resident scientist on ITV's long running series This Morning, hosting the regular bi-weekly feature "Wonderstuff". On the show, Laughlin introduced Phillip Schofield and Holly Willoughby to many marvellous materials and conducted numerous demonstrations including smelting copper and turning milk to plastic. In 2019 she returned to the show with a bang for a run of spectacular demonstrations including dripping a monster slime from the studio ceiling and ripping oxygen from hydrogen peroxide.

=== The Kitchen Cabinet ===
Laughlin was asked on to BBC Radio 4's The Kitchen Cabinet as a guest in 2015 and has since become their resident materials expert. The May 2016 episode, from Sandwich, Kent, was recorded in Laughlin's old school hall.

=== Big Life Fix ===
Laughlin was a maker of tea on the BBC Two television programme Big Life Fix. In the show, a team of designers and inventors created solutions, often as simple as repurposing everyday objects, to change people's lives. On the show, Laughlin designed a number of items, including a lightweight, durable foam helmet for a child who suffers from hydrocephalus. Laughlin described the experience as "a great show to be part of". In Series 2, "Inventing the Impossible: Big Life Fix" Laughlin made a "second skin" for a young man with Xeroderma Pigmentosum and a pair of robotic gloves that gave movement back to a man with paralysed hands.

=== Fireworks for a Tudor Queen ===
In 2017 Laughlin and Lucy Worsley presented a 90-minute BBC Four programme exploring the history of fireworks, Fizz Bang Wallop - A Tudor Firework Spectacular. The show, Fireworks for a Tudor Queen, was broadcast in March 2018.

=== The Secret Life of Landfill ===
In the spring of 2018 Laughlin and George McGavin made a BBC Four documentary The Secret Life of Landfill: A Rubbish History, exploring the fate and future of rubbish deposited in landfill sites.

=== The Secret Story of Stuff ===
In summer 2018 Laughlin wrote and presented her own show for BBC Four entitled The Secret Story of Stuff: Materials for the Modern Age, blending "bonhomie, excitement and expertise in perfect proportions". In the programme she performed a number of demonstrations to reveal the wonderous properties of materials, including a test of the thermally insulative equalities of mycelium using a high-powered blow touch and ice-cream. The show was first broadcast in the autumn of 2018 and has subsequently been repeated.

=== Plane Spotting Live ===
Over the course of 3 consecutive nights in June 2019, Laughlin co-presented Plane Spotting Live for BBC Four with Peter Snow and Andi Peters. The programme was broadcast live from a set constructed on East Midlands Aeropark, alongside the runway of East Midlands Airport.

=== How to Make ===
In How to Make, Laughlin deconstructs everyday items - training shoes, a toothbrush, and a pair of headphones - examining the materials they're made of and re-making a customised version of each. This BBC Four series first aired on 2 April 2020 and was produced in connection with the Open University.

== Television appearances ==
- Laughlin appeared on the 2018/2019 Christmas University Challenge representing King's College London alongside Anita Anand (captain), Angela Saini, and Anne Dudley.
- Laughlin appeared on the third episode of the 2024 Royal Institute Christmas Lectures, hosted by Chris Van Tulleken to explain ways that humans have prepared food over the centuries.
