= Institute of Making =

Research club at University College London

Coordinates: 51.52329°N 0.13245°W

The Institute of Making is a multidisciplinary research club based at University College London.

Composed of the Materials Library and the MakeSpace, its work focuses on hands-on research into materials and making from many different perspectives. Members are encouraged to "make, break, design and combine both advanced and traditional tools, techniques and materials".

It was founded by directors Mark Miodownik, Zoe Laughlin and Martin Conreen in 2010 at King's College London and moved to UCL in 2012, officially opening on 16 March 2013. The institute has produced some notable projects and research in the fields of making and maker culture and sensoaesthetics.
