= Britain's Most Historic Towns =

British television history series

- Genre: Documentary
- Composer: Jeremy Birchall
- Country of origin: United Kingdom
- Original language: English
- No. of series: 3
- No. of episodes: 19

Production
- Executive producer: Dominic Bowles
- Producer: Dominic Ozanne / Liam McArdle
- Running time: 48 minutes
- Production company: IWC Media

Original release
- Network: Channel 4
- Release: 7 April 2018 – 19 December 2020

Britain's Most Historic Towns is a British television history programme presented by Alice Roberts that began airing on Channel 4 in 2018. A second and third series were commissioned.

== History ==
Britain's Most Historic Towns is a history TV programme first aired as a series of six episodes beginning 7 April 2018. The premise of each episode was that presenter Professor Alice Roberts and contributor Dr Ben Robinson would provide evidence and stories to back up that week's featured town's claim to be the most historic town from some period in British history.

A second series started on Channel 4 on 18 May 2019 with an episode based on wartime Dover. Filming for the third series began in February 2020, but had to be paused from mid-March due to the national travel restrictions arising from the COVID-19 pandemic.

== List of episodes ==
=== Series 1 ===
Episode number	Episode name	Original date aired	Episode information	Viewing figure	Executive Producer/s	Series Producer
1	Roman Chester	7 April 2018	Alice visits Chester where she provides evidence to show it is Britain's most Roman town. In this episode she abseils down the city's Roman Walls; dons Roman costume to sample a banquet; visits a cafe's basement to see ancient remains; unveils the bloodthirsty entertainment available at the amphitheatre and uses CGI to show how the Roman city and Garrison would have looked.	1.84m	Dominic Bowles	Dominic Ozanne
2	Viking York	14 April 2018	Alice visits York where she provides evidence to show it is Britain's most Viking town. In this episode she takes part in a Viking battle; meets the metal detectorists behind one of Britain's greatest archaeological finds and handles a 1000 year old poo. From the air, Ben Robinson shows how the current layout of the town reflects its history.	1.49m	Dominic Bowles	Dominic Ozanne
3	Norman Winchester	21 April 2018	Alice visits Winchester where she provides evidence to show it is Britain's most Norman town. In this episode she tries to storm a castle wearing Chain mail armour; investigates the origins or modern surgery; tries eating Eel pie and uses CGI to show how the Norman city would have looked.	1.09m	Dominic Bowles	Dominic Ozanne
4	Tudor Norwich	28 April 2018	Alice visits Norwich where she provides evidence to show it is Britain's most Tudor town. In this episode she uncovers the harsh reality of religious intolerance and experiences Tudor justice by ducking in the River Wensum. From the air, Ben Robinson shows how the current layout of the town reflects its history, and they use CGI to show how the Tudor city would have looked.	1.41m	Dominic Bowles	Dominic Ozanne
5	Regency Cheltenham	4 May 2018	Alice visits Cheltenham where she provides evidence to show it is Britain's most Regency town. In this episode she uncovers the start of the Spa and joins a Regency ball with assistance from Lucy Worsley.	1.03m	Dominic Bowles	Dominic Ozanne
6	Victorian Belfast	11 May 2018	Alice visits Belfast where she provides evidence to show it is Britain's most Victorian town. In this episode she discovers how Belfast went from being a small town to a large city; has a go at spinning flax; visits the Harland and Wolff shipyard where RMS Titanic was built and meets an expert on Music hall.	0.88m	Dominic Bowles	Dominic Ozanne

=== Series 2 ===
Episode number	Episode name	Original date aired	Episode information	Viewing figure	Executive Producer/s	Series Producer
1	Wartime Dover	18 May 2019	Alice visits Dover to examine the effects of World War 2 on the town. She explores the underground base where the Dunkirk evacuation was planned, talks to a 90-year-old former ATS member about life during the Battle of Britain, and experiences life as a land girl. Ben uses aerial footage to show the challenges facing the Royal Navy.	1.39m	Dominic Bowles	Liam McArdle
2	Georgian Bristol	25 May 2019	Alice explores her home town of Bristol during the Georgian period. She investigates the Slave trade and the part Bristol played, while hearing about the Georgian love of Gin and the world's first chocolate factory at Fry's. Ben uses aerial footage to show how the wealth generated during this period changed the city.	1.28m	Dominic Bowles	Liam McArdle
3	Edwardian Cardiff	1 June 2019	Alice explores the Welsh capital of Cardiff during the Edwardian period. She discovers the growth of the city fuelled by different Marquesses of Bute and the coal trade. She investigates how it was mined, that the world trade in coal was managed in the city's coal exchange and the world's first million-pound trade deal. She also looks at how the trade links with the rest of the world brought a multicultural flavour to Cardiff in the early 20th century.	1.01m	Dominic Bowles	Liam McArdle
4	Civil War Oxford	8 June 2019	Alice explores the University city of Oxford to discover its importance during the English Civil War. She discovers why Charles I made Oxford his new capital after fleeing London, and the growth of its population during the 9 years of conflict. She also experiences Charles I's favourite sport, how to fire a musket and what life under the puritan Oliver Cromwell was like. Ben uses aerial photography to show the strategic importance of Oxford and its defences.	n/a*	Dominic Bowles	Liam McArdle
5	Plantagenet Canterbury	15 June 2019	Alice explores Canterbury and its links with the Plantagenet Kings of England. She investigates the story behind King Henry II and St Thomas Becket and the cathedral’s power during this time. Alice also looks at the influence of Geoffrey Chaucer’s book The Canterbury Tales and its part in the development of the English language. Ben uses aerial photography to show the size of the religious area of the city and the impact of the Black Death on the population during this time.	1.43m	Dominic Bowles	Liam McArdle
6	Stewart Stirling	22 June 2019	Alice visits Stirling where she provides evidence to show it is Britain's most Stewart town. She discovers the often turbulent past between Stirling and the English. Ben Robinson takes to the air to explain the town's strategic importance. Alice visits Stirling Castle to learn more about King James IV's alliance with the French. She investigates the period of history when Mary, Queen of Scots was Queen of Scotland, and later when James VI becomes James I of England.	1.19m	Dominic Bowles	Liam McArdle

=== Series 3 ===
Episode number	Episode name	Original date aired	Episode information	Viewing figure	Executive Producer/s	Series Producer
1	Medieval Lincoln	7 November 2020	Alice visits Lincoln where she discovers the legacy of William the Conqueror and the Normans. From the air, Ben Robinson shows how the nearby waterways were vital for Lincoln's prosperity. She presents the history of Nicola de la Haie and her role in the Second Battle of Lincoln that resulted in the defeat of the rebels and their French allies. Alice describes the effects of the Black Death on the town.	1.287m	Dominic Bowles	Theo Williams
2	Restoration London	14 November 2020	Alice visits London and delves into The Restoration period of 1660–1688 in the city. She learns more of the changes Charles II of England made, including the founding of the Royal Society and reopening theatres. Ben Robinson is in Greenwich, where he looks into the founding of the Royal Observatory. Alice visits the National Maritime Museum and uncovers shocking details of the slave trade. Alice draws comparisons between the Bubonic plague that ravaged the city, and the current COVID-19 pandemic.	n/a*	Dominic Bowles	Theo Williams
3	Naval Portsmouth	21 November 2020	Alice visits Portsmouth to learn more about the long history it has with the Royal Navy. She discovers some uncomfortable truths about Lord Horatio Nelson's Navy and its involvement in the slave trade. From the air, Ben Robinson examines some of Portsmouth's many forts, built in case the French invaded. Alice visits Osborne House to find out more about Queen Victoria's fondness for her summer home.	1.227m	Dominic Bowles	Theo Williams
4	Elizabethan Plymouth	28 November 2020	Alice visits Plymouth to examine the city's Elizabethan history. She discovers how Elizabeth I supported John Hawkins' and his cousin Francis Drake's privateering and involvement in the slave trade. Aerial archaeologist Ben Robinson examines Drake's Leat, a watercourse constructed in the late 16th century to provide fresh water for the navy. Alice investigates how Hawkins' and Drake's transformation of the navy led to the defeat of the Spanish Armada. She learns more about Walter Raleigh's desire to colonize the Americas and how the first Puritans set sail on the Mayflower from Plymouth for America.	1.309m	Dominic Bowles	Theo Williams
5	Glasgow's Age of Steam	5 December 2020	Alice is in Glasgow to investigate the city's importance in Britain's steam-driven Industrial Revolution. She also learns about the influx of migrant workers in the city and the unsanitary conditions in which they lived, which made Glasgow the centre of several important medical advances. Ben Robinson uses aerial footage to show how Loch Katrine provides fresh water for the city. Professor Willy Maley recalls the visit of Buffalo Bill's Wild West show to Glasgow.	1.227m	Dominic Bowles	Theo Williams
6	Georgian Edinburgh	12 December 2020	Alice explores Edinburgh to discover the role the city played in the union between England and Scotland. She investigates the city's link to the slave trade through the statue of Henry Dundas, visits the Royal Bank of Scotland to find out about the world's first overdraft and investigates how medical law was influenced by the body snatchers Burke and Hare.	1.206m	Dominic Bowles	Theo Williams
7	Industrial Revolution Manchester	19 December 2020	Alice explores Manchester to reveal the story of revolt and protest of the British working classes that occurred during the Industrial Revolution. She visits Chetham's Library where she sees the desk where Karl Marx and Friedrich Engels devised their communist ideas after seeing the conditions of the working class in Manchester. Alice also investigates the City's hatred of the Corn Laws at the Free Trade Hall, and at the John Rylands Library looks at rarely seen documents which show the human cost of the Peterloo Massacre.		Dominic Bowles	Theo Williams

∗ Not in BARB top 20 viewing figures
