= Alice Roberts =

British academic, TV presenter and author

Alice Roberts FRSB
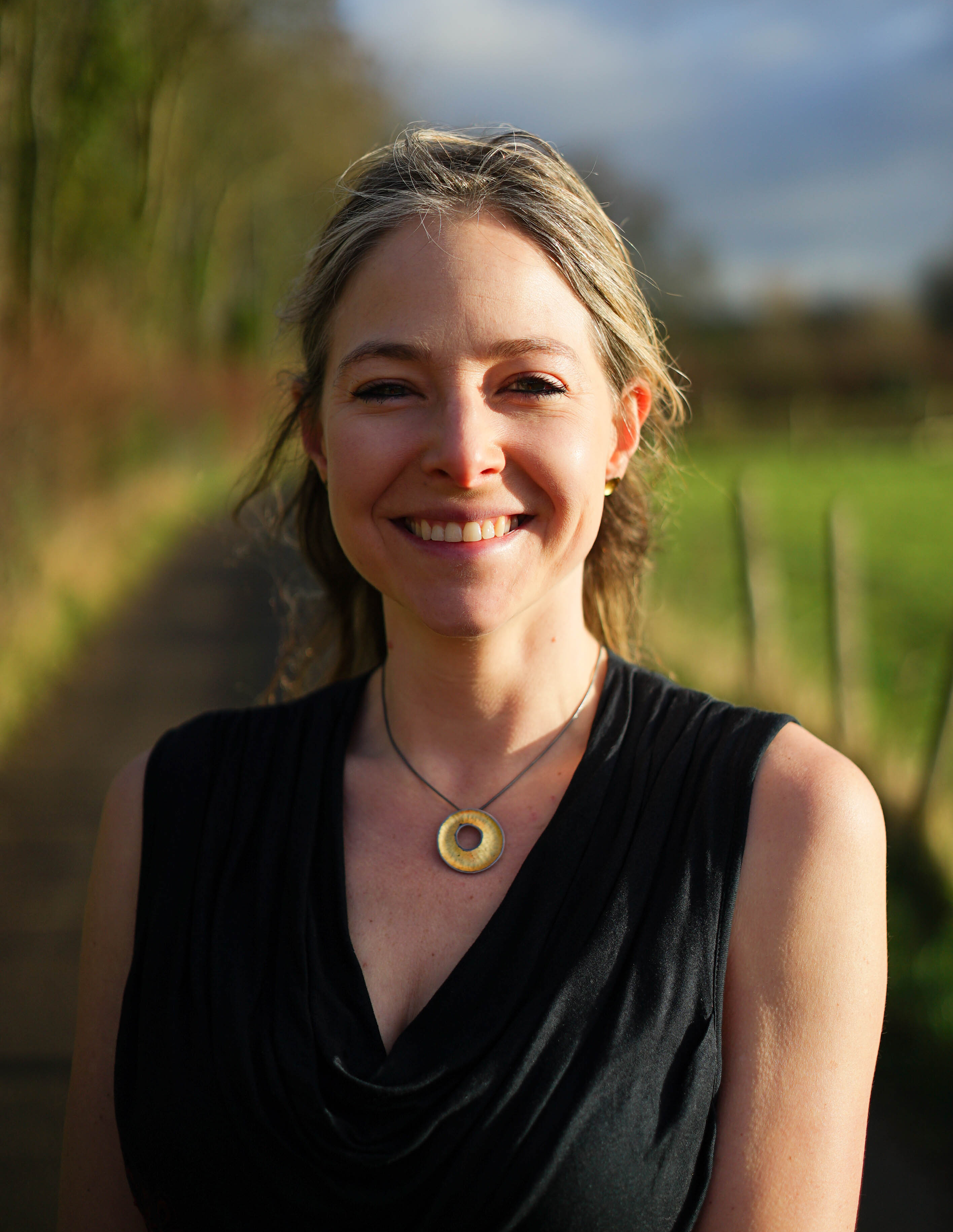
- Roberts in 2016
- Born: Alice May Roberts; 19 May 1973 (age 53); Bristol, England
- Education: Redmaids' High School; University of Wales (BSc, MB BCh); University of Bristol (PhD)
- Known for: Origins of Us; Prehistoric Autopsy; The Incredible Human Journey; Ice Age Giants; Coast; Digging for Britain; Time Team; Britain's Most Historic Towns
- Spouse: David Stevens (m. 2009)
- Children: 2
- Scientific career
- Fields: Biological anthropology; Evolutionary biology
- Workplaces: University of Birmingham; National Health Service; British Broadcasting Corporation; University of Wales; University of Bristol
- Thesis: Rotator cuff disease in humans and apes : a palaeopathological and evolutionary perspective on shoulder pathology (2008)
- Website: www.alice-roberts.co.uk

Alice May Roberts FRSB (born 19 May 1973) is a British academic, anatomist, archaeologist, TV presenter and author. Since 2012 she has been professor of Public Engagement in Science at the University of Birmingham. She served as president of the charity Humanists UK from January 2019 to May 2022, and is now a vice-president of the organisation.

== Early life and education ==
Roberts was born in Bristol in 1973, the daughter of an aeronautical engineer and an English and arts teacher. She grew up in the Bristol suburb of Westbury-on-Trym, and was privately educated at Redmaids' High School. Roberts has said that her fascination with the ancient past was sparked by watching a video of a live unwrapping of a mummy at Bristol Museum when she was aged 8.

In December 1988, Roberts won the BBC1 Blue Peter Young Artists competition, appearing with her picture and the presenters on the front cover of the 10 December 1988 edition of the Radio Times.

Roberts studied medicine at the University of Wales College of Medicine (now part of Cardiff University) and graduated in 1997 with a Bachelor of Medicine, Bachelor of Surgery (MB BCh) degree, having gained an intercalated Bachelor of Science degree in anatomy. In 2008, after seven years, she completed her PhD in paleopathology, the study of disease in ancient human remains.

== Research and career ==
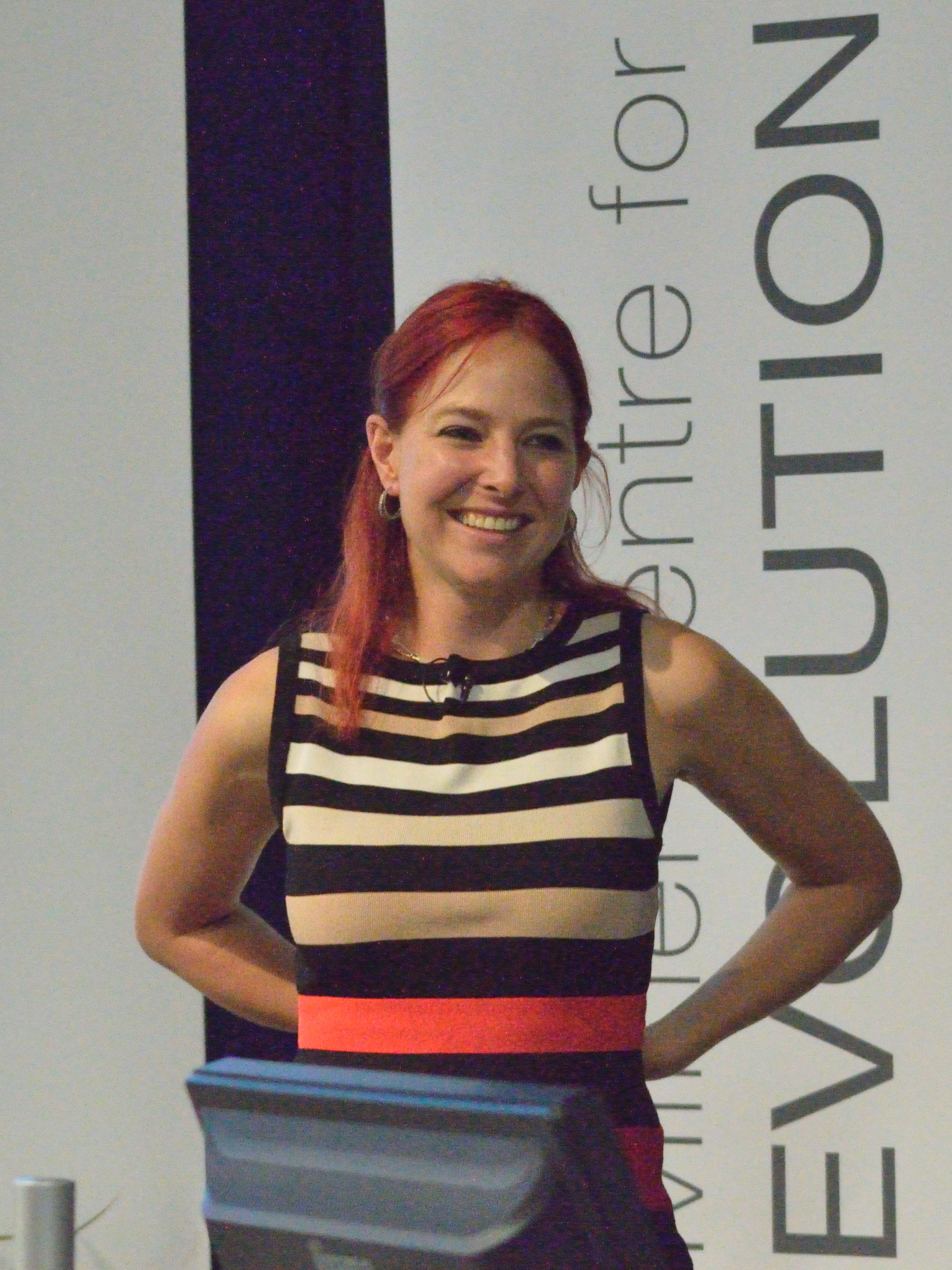
Roberts giving a public lecture for the opening of the Milner Centre for Evolution at the University of Bath in 2018

After graduating, Roberts worked as a junior doctor with the National Health Service in South Wales for 18 months. In 1998, she left clinical medicine and worked as an anatomy demonstrator at the University of Bristol, becoming a lecturer there in 1999.

She spent seven years working part-time on her PhD in paleopathology, receiving the degree in 2008. She was a senior teaching fellow at the University of Bristol Centre for Comparative and Clinical Anatomy, where her main roles were teaching clinical anatomy, embryology, and physical anthropology, as well as researching osteoarchaeology and paleopathology. She stated in 2009 that she was working towards becoming a professor of anatomy.

In 2009, she co-presented modules for the Beating Bipolar programme, the first online treatment package for bipolar depression, trialled by Cardiff University researchers. A clinical trial began in June 2009 involving about 100 patients with bipolar disorder in South Wales.

From August 2009 until January 2012, Roberts was a visiting fellow in both the Department of Archaeology and Anthropology and the Department of Anatomy of the University of Bristol. From 2009 to 2016 Roberts was Director of Anatomy at the NHS Severn Deanery School of Surgery and also an honorary fellow at Hull York Medical School.

In February 2012, Roberts was appointed the University of Birmingham's first Professor of Public Engagement in Science.

Roberts has been a member of the advisory board of Cheltenham Science Festival for 10 years and a member of the Advisory Board of the Milner Centre for Evolution at the University of Bath since 2018.

Writing in the i newspaper in 2016, Roberts dismissed the aquatic ape hypothesis (AAH) as a distraction "from the emerging story of human evolution that is more interesting and complex", adding that AAH has become "a theory of everything" that is simultaneously "too extravagant and too simple". She concluded by saying that "science is about evidence, not wishful thinking".

Roberts and Aoife McLysaght co-presented the 2018 Royal Institution Christmas Lectures in London. She was president of the British Science Association for the year 2019–2020.

In January 2021, Roberts presented a 10-part narrative history series about the human body entitled Bodies on BBC Radio 4.

In June 2026, Roberts won best-in-show with an evolution-themed garden at BBC Gardeners' World Live 2026 at the National Exhibition Centre (NEC) in Birmingham, in collaboration with garden designer David Stevens. She was headline speaker at the Battle of Evesham Festival in August 2026.

=== Television career ===
Roberts first appeared on television in the Time Team Live 2001 episode, working on Anglo-Saxon burials at Breamore, Hampshire. She served as a bone specialist and general presenter in many episodes, including the spin-off series Extreme Archaeology. In August 2006, Roberts was one of the main presenters for the Time Team special episode Big Royal Dig, which investigated archaeology of Britain's royal palaces.

A presenter of science and history television documentaries, Roberts was one of the regular co-presenters of the BBC geographical and environmental series Coast.

Roberts wrote and presented a BBC Two series on anatomy and health entitled Dr Alice Roberts: Don't Die Young, which was broadcast from January 2007. She presented a five-part series on human evolution and early human migrations for BBC Two entitled The Incredible Human Journey, beginning on 10 May 2009. In September 2009, she co-presented (with doctor Mark Hamilton) A Necessary Evil?, a one-hour documentary about the Burke and Hare murders.

In August 2010, she presented a one-hour documentary on BBC Four, Wild Swimming, inspired by Roger Deakin's book Waterlog. Roberts presented a four-part BBC Two series on archaeology in August–September 2010, Digging for Britain. Roberts explained, "We're taking a fresh approach by showing British archaeology as it's happening out in the field, from the excitement of artefacts as they come out of the ground, through to analysing them in the lab and working out what they tell us about human history." The show was successful and aired its thirteenth series in early 2026. In February 2026, Roberts announced that she would be leaving the show after 15 years.

In March 2011, she presented a BBC documentary in the Horizon series entitled Are We Still Evolving? Later that year she presented another documentary, How to Build a Dinosaur, which aired on BBC Four on 21 September 2011.

She presented the series Origins of Us, which aired on BBC Two in October 2011, examining how the human body has adapted through seven million years of evolution. The last part of this series featured Roberts visiting the Rift Valley in East Africa.

In April 2012, Roberts presented Woolly Mammoth: Secrets from the Ice on BBC Two. From 22 to 24 October 2012, she appeared, with co-presenter Dr George McGavin, in the BBC series Prehistoric Autopsy, which discussed the remains of early hominids such as Neanderthals, Homo erectus and Australopithecus afarensis. In May and June 2013 she presented the BBC Two series Ice Age Giants. In September 2014, she was a presenter on the Horizon programme Is Your Brain Male or Female?

In October 2014, she presented BBC TV show Spider House, about overcoming her arachnophobia. In 2015, she co-presented a 3-part BBC TV documentary with Neil Oliver entitled The Celts: Blood, Iron and Sacrifice and wrote a book to tie in with the series: The Celts: Search for a Civilisation. In April–May 2016, she co-presented the BBC Two programme Food Detectives which looked at food nutrition and its effects on the body. In August 2016, she presented the BBC Four documentary Britain's Pompeii: A Village Lost in Time, which explored the Must Farm Bronze Age settlement in Cambridgeshire. In May 2017, she was a presenter of the BBC Two documentary The Day The Dinosaurs Died. In April 2018, she presented the six-part Channel 4 series Britain's Most Historic Towns, which examines the history of British towns, which was followed by a second series in May 2019 and a third series in November 2020.

In September 2018, she presented the BBC Two documentary King Arthur's Britain: The Truth Unearthed, which examines new archaeological discoveries that cast light on the political and trading situation in Britain during the Early Middle Ages. In December 2018, she presented a series of three Royal Institution Christmas Lectures, titled Who am I? and broadcast on BBC Four, with guest lecturer Aoife McLysaght.

On 4 August 2020, Roberts was the guest on BBC Radio 4's The Life Scientific. Aired as a three-part series in September 2020, Roberts co-presented the BBC's The Big Dig focusing on the finds at St. James's Park in London and Park Street in Birmingham.

On 12 February 2021, Roberts presented a one-hour BBC Two documentary, Stonehenge: The Lost Circle Revealed, about Mike Parker Pearson's five-year-long quest that filled in a 400-year historical gap in the provenance of the bluestones of Stonehenge and Waun Mawn.

On 14 March 2022, Curse Of The Ancients with Alice Roberts, a five-part documentary series presented by Roberts premiered on Sky History. In October Roberts presented Royal Autopsy, a two-part documentary series shown on Sky History; a second series was commissioned in November 2023. The series examined the deaths of Queen Elizabeth I and King Charles II, and then Queen Anne, Queen Mary I, King Henry IV and King George IV. Roberts presented the second series of Royal Autopsy that aired during April 2024.

In December 2022, Roberts played cameo role of herself in the Detectorists Christmas special.

In March and April 2023, Roberts presented the four-part Channel 4 series Fortress Britain with Alice Roberts. Other work for the channel includes the four-part series Ancient Egypt by Train with Alice Roberts, Ottoman Empire by Train with Alice Roberts (autumn 2024), Ancient Greece by Train with Alice Roberts (spring 2025), and Roman Empire by Train with Alice Roberts (early 2026).

In May 2024, Roberts presented the documentary The Lost Scrolls of Pompeii: New Revelations, which aired on Channel 5.

In October 2025, Roberts co-presented Witches of Essex with Rylan Clark, a three-part series on Sky History. In February 2026, Roberts presented Lost Grail with Alice Roberts, a three-part series on Sky History about Biblical figure Joseph of Arimathea.

In March 2026, Roberts presented Our Hospital Through Time, a six-part series on Channel 5 exploring St Bartholomew's Hospital through historical and contemporary themes.

Roberts will present Alice Roberts: Grounded; an upcoming archaeological, industry, and landscape series to be aired on Channel 4 later in 2026.

The Public Broadcasting Service (PBS) has commissioned Secrets of the Ancient Wonders; an upcoming four-part documentary series presented by Roberts is due to air on the channel in 2027.

=== Awards and honours ===
In 2011, Roberts was elected an honorary fellow of the British Science Association, and a fellow of the Royal Society of Biology. In 2014, she was selected by the Science Council as one of their leading UK practising scientists. During 2014, she was President of The Association for Science Education, and presented the Morgan-Botti lecture.

Roberts has received honorary doctorates (DSc) from Royal Holloway, University of London; Bournemouth University; the Open University, the University of Leeds, and the University of Leicester; honorary Doctor of Medicine (MD) from the University of Sussex; and honorary Doctor of Education from the University of Bath.

In 2019, she was awarded an Honorary Fellowship by Cardiff University.

Roberts was awarded British Humanist of the Year 2015, for work promoting the teaching of evolution in schools.

The Incredible Unlikeliness of Being was shortlisted for the Wellcome Book Prize 2015.

In 2020, Roberts won the Royal Society David Attenborough Award and Lecture.

On 22 May 2022, Roberts unveiled the Statue of Mary Anning at Lyme Regis; the statue was the result of a crowdfunded campaign ("Mary Anning Rocks") to commission and display a statue to the palaeontologist Mary Anning in Lyme Regis.

In 2025, Roberts's book Crypt: life, death, and disease in the Middle Ages and beyond won Current Archaeology's Book of the Year award for 2025.

=== Publications ===
Roberts is an author. She has authored or co-authored several peer reviewed scientific articles in journals. Her published books include:

- Proceedings of the 6th Annual Conference of the British Association for Biological Anthropology and Osteoarchaeology. Archaeopress. 2007. ISBN 978-1-4073-0035-1. OCLC 124507736.
- Robson-Brown, Kate; Roberts, Alice (2007). BABAO 2004 : Proceedings of the 6th Annual Conference of the British Association for Biological Anthropology and Osteoarchaeology, University of Bristol. British Archaeological Reports. Oxford, England: Archaeopress. ISBN 978-1-4073-0035-1.
- Don't Die Young: An Anatomist's Guide to Your Organs and Your Health. Bloomsbury Publishing. 2007. ISBN 978-0-7475-9025-5. OCLC 81195249.
- The Incredible Human Journey. Bloomsbury Publishing. 2009. ISBN 978-0-7475-9839-8. OCLC 646959203.
- The Complete Human Body. Dorling Kindersley. 2010. ISBN 978-1-4053-4749-5. OCLC 951155923.
- Evolution The Human Story. Dorling Kindersley. 2011. ISBN 978-1-4053-6165-1. OCLC 1038452947. Revised edition (2018), Dorling Kindersley, ISBN 978-1-4654-7401-8
- Human anatomy: the definitive visual guide. Dorling Kindersley, 2014. ISBN 9780241292082, OCLC 1010946584
- The Incredible Unlikeliness of Being: Evolution and the Making of Us. Heron Books. 2014. ISBN 978-1-8486-6477-7. OCLC 910702281.
- The Celts: Search for a Civilisation. Heron Books. 2015. ISBN 978-1784293321. OCLC 967497115.
- Tamed: Ten Species that Changed our World. Hutchinson Books. 2017. ISBN 978-1786330611. OCLC 1038452971.
- Copson, Andrew; Roberts, Alice (2020). The Little Book of Humanism: Universal lessons on finding purpose, meaning and joy. Little, Brown Book Group. ISBN 978-0349425467.
- Ancestors: A Prehistory of Britain in Seven Burials. Simon & Schuster. 2021. ISBN 978-1471188015.
- Buried: An alternative history of the first millennium in Britain. Simon & Schuster UK. 2022. ISBN 978-1398510036
- Anatomical Oddities. Simon & Schuster. 2022. ISBN 978-1398510067. OCLC 1351645158.
- Wolf Road. Simon & Schuster. 2023. ISBN 978-1398521339. OCLC 1398521337.
- Crypt: life, death, and disease in the Middle Ages and beyond. Simon & Schuster. 2024. ISBN 978-1398519237. OCLC 1398519235.
- Domination. Simon & Schuster. 2025. ISBN 978-1398510081.
- Humans: The Evolution of a Species. Dorling Kindersley, 2026. ISBN 9780241682746, OCLC 0241682746
- The Goddess Queen. Simon & Schuster, 2026. ISBN 9781398567832, OCLC 139856303X

== Personal life ==
Roberts lives with her husband, David Stevens, and two children, a daughter born in 2010 and a son born in 2013. She met her husband in Cardiff in 1995 when she was a medical student and he was an archaeology student. They married in 2009.

Roberts was estranged from her parents for several years before her mother's death, and did not attend her funeral. Her rejection of her parents' Christianity led to the relationship breach.

Roberts is a pescatarian, "a confirmed atheist" and humanist. She is the former president of Humanists UK, beginning her three-and-a-half-year term in January 2019. She is now a vice president of the organisation. Her children were assigned a faith school due to over-subscription of her local community schools; she campaigns against state-funded religious schools, citing her story as an example of the problems perpetuated by faith schools.

Roberts enjoys painting and drawing, gardening, yoga, cycling and swimming. Roberts is an organiser of the Cheltenham Science Festival and school outreach programmes within the University of Bristol's Medical Sciences Division. In March 2007, she hosted the Bristol Medical School's charity dance show Clicendales 2007, to raise funds for the charity CLIC Sargent.

Roberts took her baby daughter with her when touring for the six-month filming of the first series of Digging for Britain in 2010.

In March 2024 Roberts was the guest for BBC Radio 4's Desert Island Discs, where her musical choices included "Monkey Gone to Heaven" by the Pixies, "Temple of Love" by The Sisters of Mercy, and "Sugar" by System of a Down.
