= Morgan-Botti lecture =

Annual event in Wales which concentrates on innovation, technology and science

The Morgan-Botti lecture is an annual event in Wales which concentrates on innovation, technology and science. It is supported by Airbus Wales and is aimed at educating and informing as well as the promotion of Wales. It is named after Rhodri Morgan, who was the First Minister of Wales and Jean Botti, who was the Chief Technology Officer of Airbus Group. Attendees at the lecture generally include industrialists, entrepreneurs, government officials and senior academics.

The inaugural Lecture was given by Professor Lord Robert Winston in 2011.

The lectures are held at the National Museum Cardiff.

In 2016 the lecture was retitled the Endeavr 2016 Celebration Event and became the launch event of the Wales Festival of Innovation.

== The Lectures ==
- 2011 Lord Robert Winston
- 2012 Lord Martin Rees
- 2013 Mark Miodownik
- 2014 Alice Roberts
- 2015 Andy Hopper
- 2016 Kevin Warwick
