= Patrick Miles (writer) =

Patrick Miles (born 30 January 1948) is an English writer and translator. He was born in Sandwich, Kent and attended Sir Roger Manwood's Grammar School, then read Russian and German at Gonville and Caius College, Cambridge, graduating in 1971.

He taught Russian and German language/literature for all Cambridge colleges from 1971 to 1977 and 1987 to 1993, as well as researching early Chekhov with a period spent in Moscow 1972 to 1974, meeting leading Russian literary critics including Mikhail Bakhtin. He has been a writer, translator, and researcher since then, and worked in the theatre, including being artistic director of the Cambridge Chekhov Company and Russian consultant to the Royal National Theatre. He was also a Senior Research Associate at Cambridge University 1984–87, after which he ran an information consultancy and a European translation agency 1991–99.

In 2010 Miles was awarded a Cambridge PhD for his publications on Russian literature, especially the work of Anton Chekhov.

He currently resides in Cambridge, where he continues to write books, articles, poems and plays.

== Selected works ==
=== Books ===
1. Chekhov on the British Stage (Cambridge, CUP, 1993) (edited and translated by) ISBN 978-0521384674
2. Mikhail Gromov, Chekhov Scholar and Critic: An Essay in Cultural Difference (Nottingham, Astra Press, 2006) ISBN 978-0946134687
3. Brief Lives: Anton Chekhov (London, Hesperus Press, 2008) ISBN 978-1843919001
4. George Calderon: Edwardian Genius (Cambridge, Sam&Sam, 2018) ISBN 978-1999967604
5. What Can We Hope For? (Cambridge, Sam&Sam, 2019) with John Polkinghorne ISBN 978-1999967611

=== Plays and Stage Adaptations ===
1. Ivanov (1974)
2. Happiness! (1974), a programme of Chekov's one-act plays
3. The Cherry Orchard (1975)
4. The Most Absolute Freedom (1975), an entertainment about the young Chekhov
5. Rabbits (1975), a one-act play
6. Last Summer in Chulimsk (1977)
7. Duck-Hunting (1977)
8. White Guard (1978)
9. A Month in the Country (1979)
10. In One Stay (1982), a one-act play
11. The Life and Extraordinary Adventures of Ivan Chonkin (1988), by Vladimir Voinovich
12. On the Bottom of Life (1994), by Maxim Gorky
13. The Conjurer (1995), by Sacha Guitry
14. Let's Dream (1995), by Sacha Guitry
15. It Makes a Break (1997), a one-act play
16. Sara (1997), an adaptation of Chekhov's Ivanov
17. Far Out (1998), a one-act play

=== Major Translations ===
1. Chekhov: The Early Stories 1883–88, translated by Patrick Miles and Harvey Pitcher (John Murray/Macmillan New York, 1982; Abacus 1984; World's Classics 1994, Oxford World's Classics 1999)
2. A Theatre Romance (1990), translation of Teatral'nyi roman by Bulgakov, commissioned by the Royal National Theatre
3. Two Plays by Aleksandr Vampilov (1994)
4. The Russian Theatre after Stalin (1999)
5. A Moth on the Fence (2009)

=== Articles, Papers, Book Chapters ===
1. Chekhov and the Company Problem in the British Theatre, in Chekhov on the British Stage (1993), pp. 185–93
2. Aleksandr Vampilov: A Playwright whose Time is Now, in British East-West Journal (December 1994), pp. 7–8
3. Chekhov, Shakespeare, the Ensemble and the Company; Peter Hall interviewed by Patrick Miles New Theatre Quarterly, 11, no.43 (1995), pp. 203–10
4. Chekhov on the English Stage, in Chekhov and World Literature (1997), pp. 493–534
5. Leavis and Bakhtin, Cambridge Review, November 1998, pp. 42–46
6. A Conversation with Bakhtin, Forum for Modern Language Studies, 36, no.4, October 2000, pp. 438–49
7. Cheshire Cats in the Theatre: A Translation and Fringe Experience, New Theatre Quarterly, November 2000, pp. 359–63
8. Early Chekhov: The Making of a Totalitarian Consensus, Slavonica, 14 (2008), no.1, pp. 18–43
9. Chekhov at 150: The "Hampstead Connection", The London Magazine, June/July 2010, pp. 98–102
10. Joseph Brodsky in Leningrad, Poetry Nation Review, May–June 2019, pp. 17–20
