= Mark Miodownik =

British materials scientist, engineer, broadcaster and writer

Mark Miodownik MBE FREng
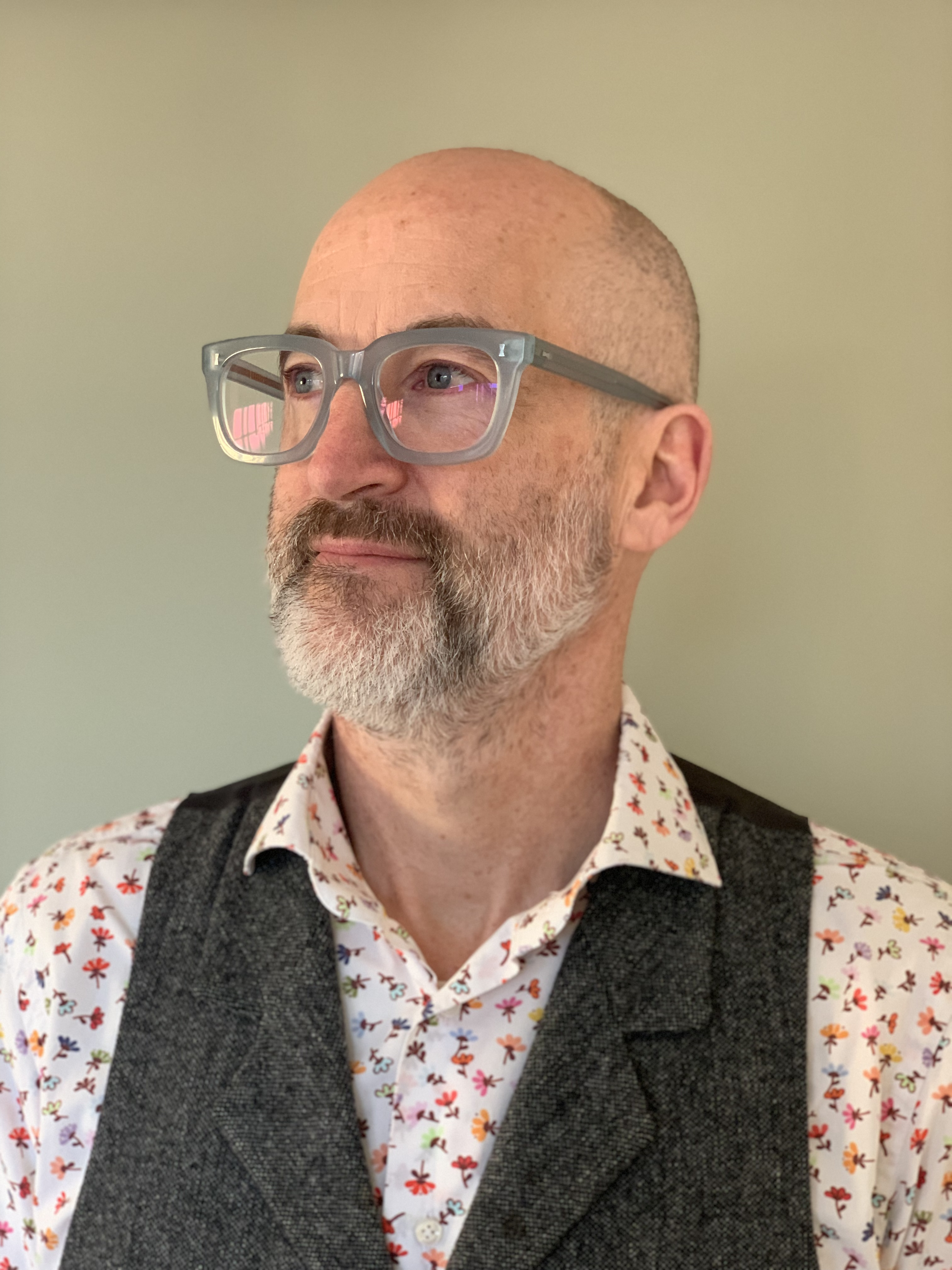
- Born: Mark Andrew Miodownik; 25 April 1969 (age 57); London, England
- Education: Emanuel School
- Alma mater: University of Oxford (BA, DPhil)
- Known for: Broadcasting
- Awards: Hetherington Prize (1995); Morgan-Botti lecture (2013); Royal Institution Christmas Lectures (2010); AAAS Public Engagement with Science Award (2015); Michael Faraday Prize (2017)
- Scientific career
- Fields: Materials Science; Metallurgy
- Workplaces: King's College London; University College London
- Thesis: Fundamentals of grain growth phenomena in ODS alloys (1996)
- Website: markmiodownik.net

Mark Andrew Miodownik MBE FREng (/ˌmiːəˈdɒvnɪk/) is a British materials scientist, engineer, broadcaster and writer at University College London. Previously, he was the head of the Materials Research Group at King's College London, and a co-founder of Materials Library.

== Education ==
Miodownik attended Emanuel School in South London. In 1987 he went to St Catherine's College, Oxford where he graduated with a Bachelor of Science degree in metallurgy. He completed his Doctor of Philosophy degree in turbine jet engine alloys at Linacre College, Oxford in 1996, specifically oxide dispersion strengthened (ODS) alloys. For the presentation of his doctoral work at Oxford, he was awarded the Hetherington Prize in 1995.

Mark Miodownik says that his interest in materials came from an incident when he was stabbed in the back with a razor blade, on his way to school. Realising that a small piece of steel had done him so much harm started his interest in materials.

== Career and research ==
Miodownik's scientific research is primarily in materials science, metallurgy and biomechanics. He has also been key to the development of the concept of sensoaesthetics, which is the "application of scientific methodology to the aesthetic, sensual and emotional side" of materials.

=== Broadcasting ===
In 2001 Miodownik gave a series of talks at the Institute of Contemporary Arts (ICA) on aesthetics in the arts and sciences. In 2003 he co-founded the Materials Library, a website for people working in materials science, with a grant from NESTA. In 2005 he organised two talks at Tate Modern on the influence of new materials on the arts. In 2006 he and two other scientists produced AfterImage, an installation that explores light and colour perception, which was exhibited at the Hayward Gallery. In 2007 the Materials Library made a podcast, "What can the matter be?", hosted by the Tate. He was interviewed by Jim Al-Khalili for The Life Scientific first broadcast on BBC Radio 4 in March 2014.

He was one of the judges of the 2008 Art Fund Prize. He often gives talks at the Cheltenham Science Festival, of which he is a member of the advisory group. In 2010 he placed 89 in a Times list of the 100 most influential people in science and delivered that year's Royal Institution Christmas Lectures. The three-part series, Size Matters, looked at how size influences everything, including the shape of the universe, and aired on BBC Four in late December.

Miodownik has done work with the Tate Modern, the Hayward Gallery, and the Wellcome Collection. He has close ties to the Royal Institution of Great Britain and presented a Friday Evening Discourse in February 2013 entitled "Strange Material". His television appearances include Wonderstuff on BBC Two in August 2011, The How it Works series on BBC Four in 2012 and The Genius of Invention on BBC Two in early 2013. He also appeared as a regular guest on Dara Ó Briain's Science Club on BBC Two in late 2012.

=== Awards & honours ===
Miodownik was elected a Fellow of the Royal Academy of Engineering in 2014. His book Stuff Matters: The Strange Stories of the Marvellous Materials that Shape Our Man-made World won the 2014 Royal Society Winton Prize for Science Books, and a National Academies of Sciences, Engineering, and Medicine Communication Award in 2015. He was awarded the American Association for the Advancement of Science Prize for Public Engagement with Science the same year.

In 2017, Miodownik was awarded the Michael Faraday Prize and Lecture by the Royal Society, and in the 2018 New Year Honours he was awarded an MBE for "services to Science, Engineering and Broadcasting".

== Publications ==
- Stuff Matters: The Strange Stories of the Marvellous Materials that Shape Our Man-made World (2014), ISBN 978-0241955185
- Liquid Rules: The Delightful and Dangerous Substances That Flow Through Our Lives Paperback (2020), ISBN 978-0358108450
- It's a Gas: The Sublime and Elusive Elements That Expand Our World (2023), ISBN 978-0358157151
