= Firewall (construction) =

Barrier used to prevent the spread of fire through or between structures

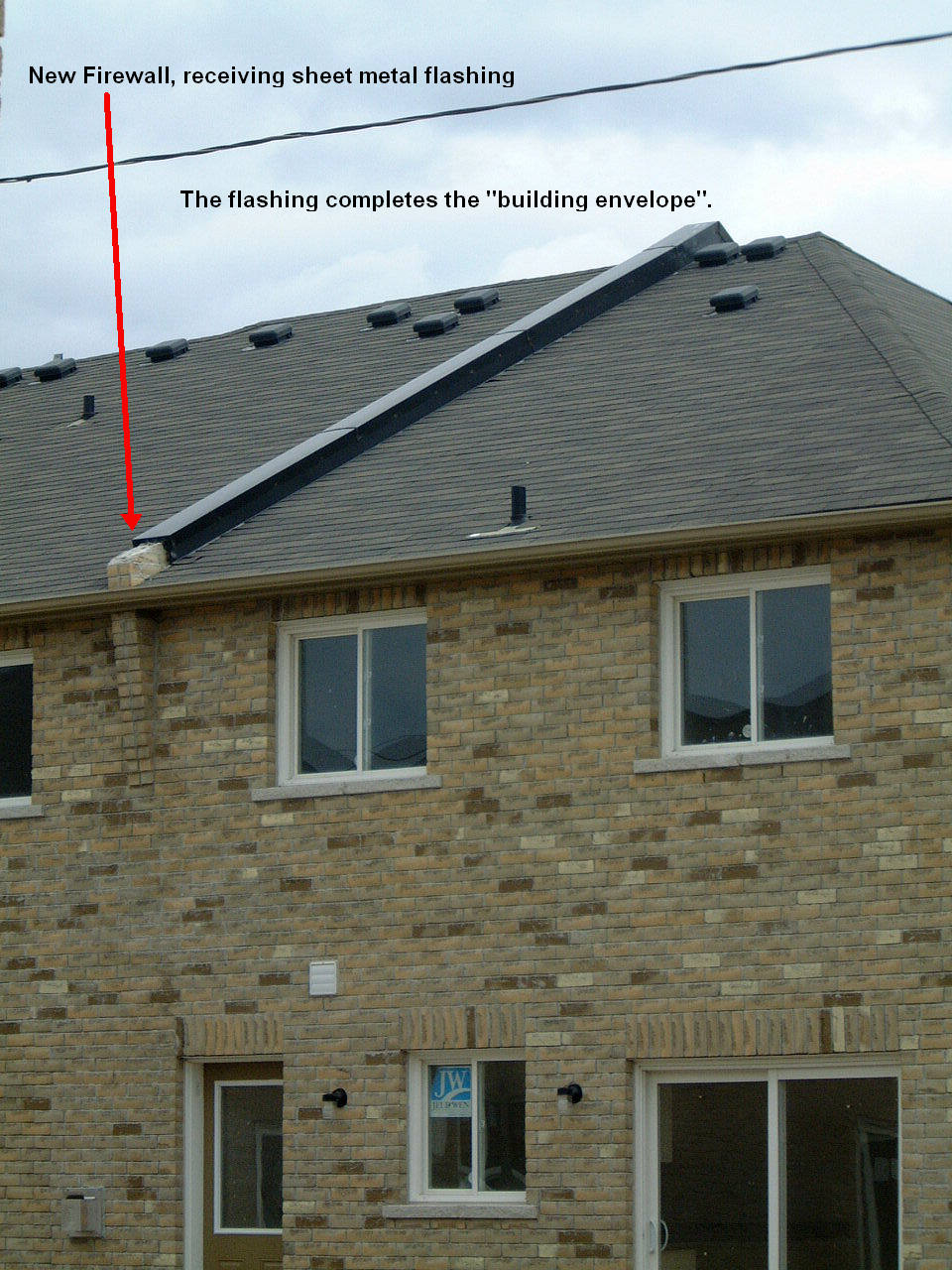
Firewall residential construction, separating the building into two separate residential units, and fire areas

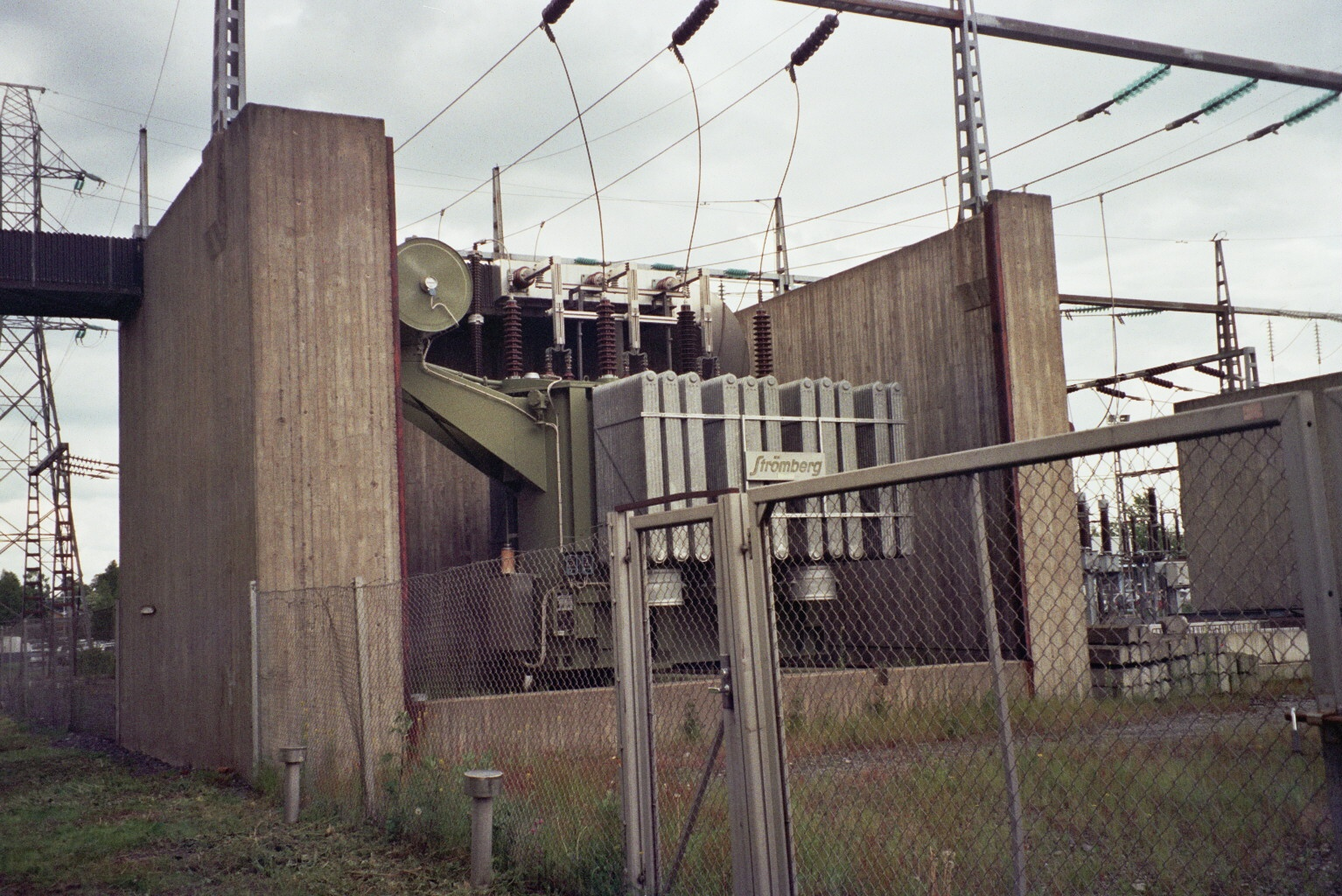
Example of a firewall used to inhibit the spread of a fire at an electrical substation

A firewall is a fire-resistant barrier used to prevent the spread of fire. Firewalls are built between or through buildings, structures, or electrical substation transformers, or within an aircraft or vehicle.

== Applications ==
Firewalls can be used to subdivide a building into separate fire areas and are constructed in accordance with the locally applicable building codes. Firewalls are a portion of a building's passive fire protection systems and in relation to fire safety, compartmentation is a key strategy for passive fire protection, whereby a structure is divided into fire compartments, defined as enclosed spaces which are separated from all other parts of the building by enclosing construction providing a fire separation with a required fire-resistance rating. Compartmentation is intended to limit the spread of fire, smoke, and combustion gases, thereby contributing to the primary objectives of fire protection:

- life safety
- property protection
- continuity of operations.

Firewalls can be used to separate-high value transformers at an electrical substation in the event of a mineral oil tank rupture and ignition. The firewall serves as a fire containment wall between one oil-filled transformer and other neighboring transformers, building structures, and site equipment.

== Types ==
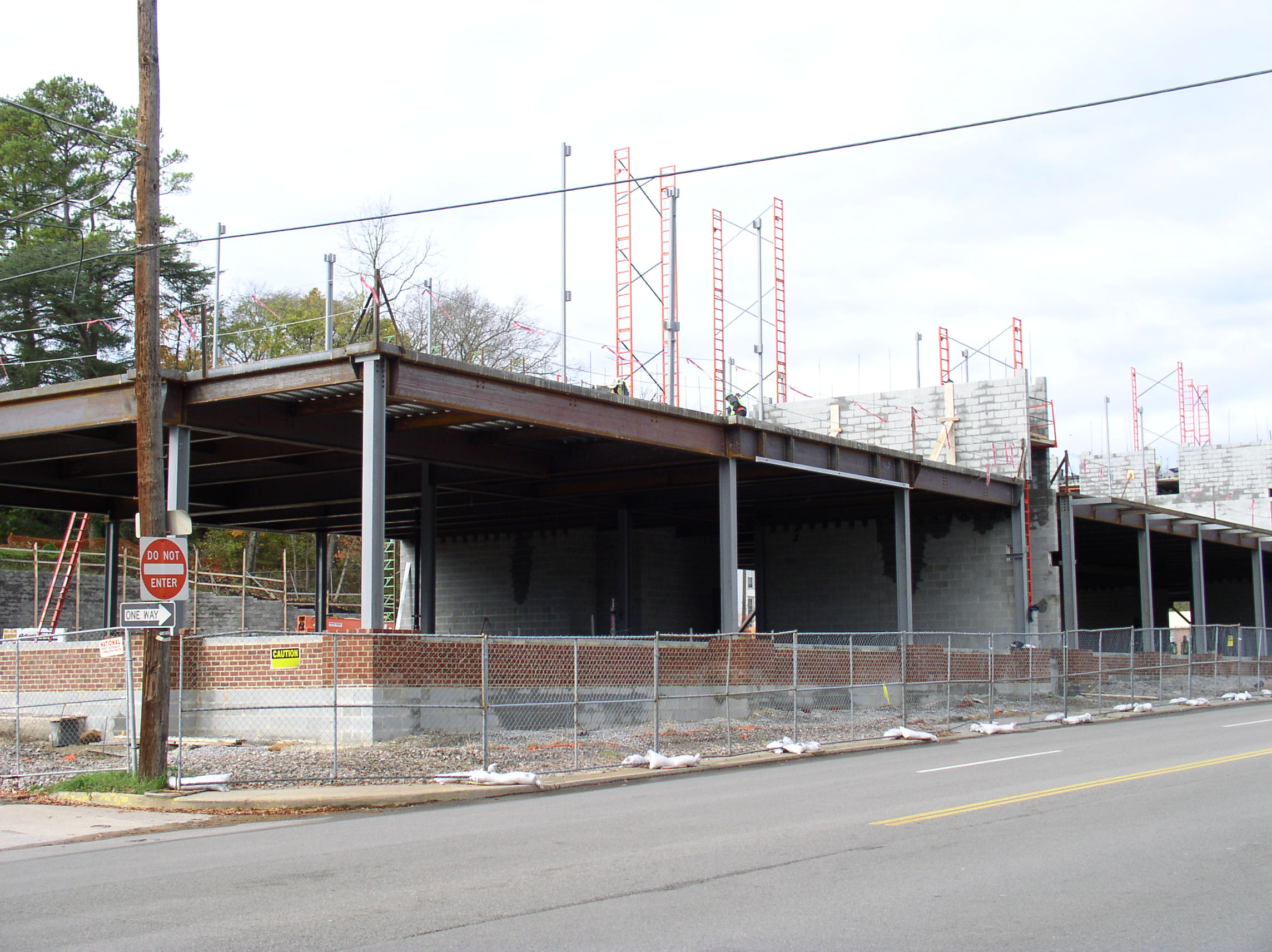
A building under construction, showing the structurally independent cinderblock firewalls subdividing the building

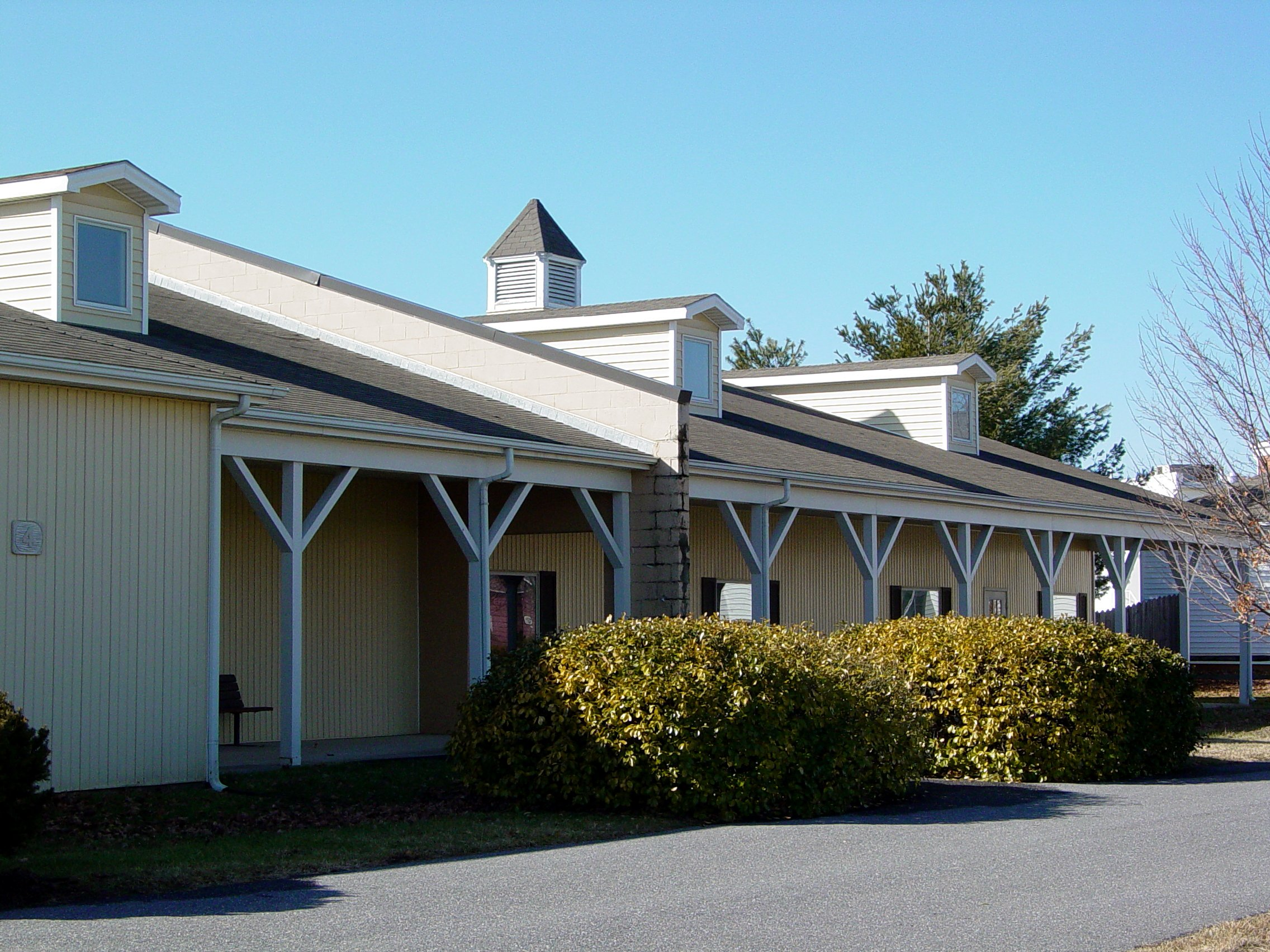
Building 4 of the Waynesboro Outlet Village, showing a concrete firewall running through the building

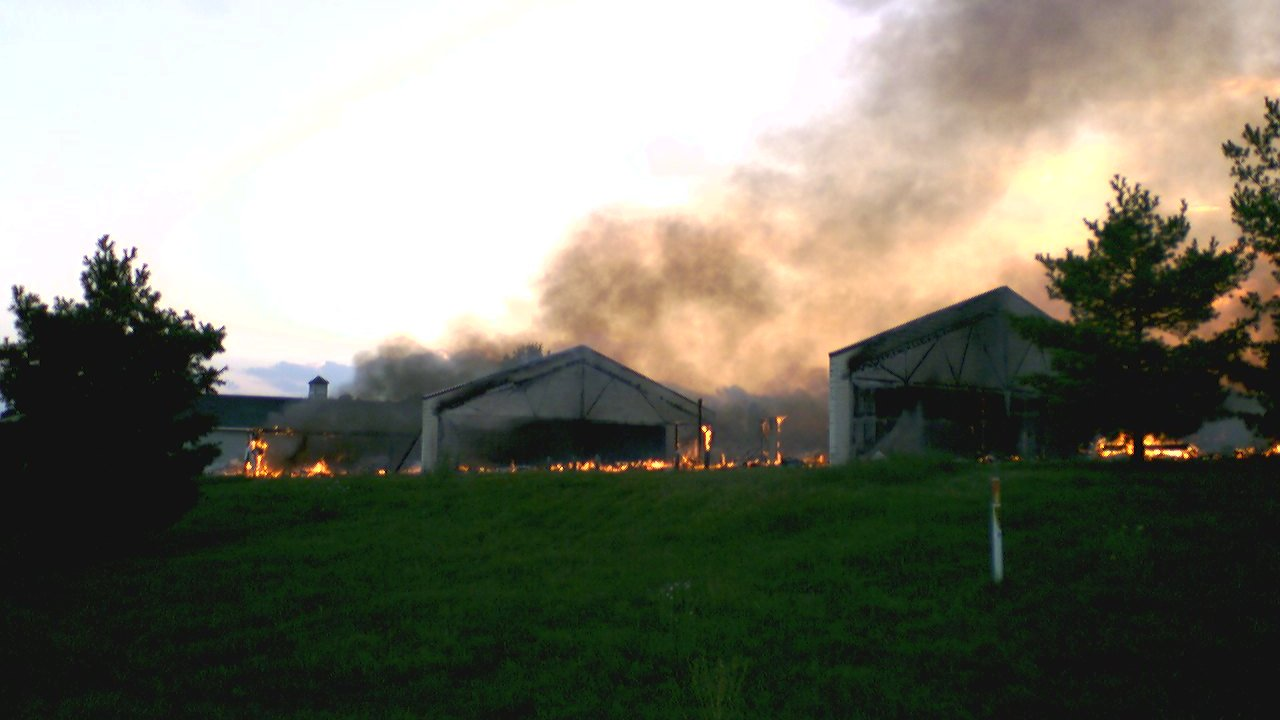
Concrete firewalls still standing on Building 7 of the former Waynesboro Outlet Village, following a firefighter training exercise which intentionally burned the building

There are three main classifications of fire rated walls: fire walls, fire barriers, and fire partitions.

- A firewall is an assembly of materials used to delay the spread of fire a wall assembly with a prescribed fire resistance duration and independent structural stability. This allows a building to be subdivided into smaller sections. If a section becomes structurally unstable due to fire or other causes, that section can break or fall away from the other sections in the building.
- A fire barrier wall, or a fire partition, is a fire-rated wall assembly that are not structurally self-sufficient.

Fire barrier walls are typically continuous from an exterior wall to an exterior wall, or from a floor below to a floor or roof above, or from one fire barrier wall to another fire barrier wall, having a fire resistance rating equal to or greater than the required rating for the application. Fire barriers are continuous through concealed spaces (e.g., above a ceiling) to the floor deck or roof deck above the barrier. Fire partitions are not required to extend through concealed spaces if the construction assembly forming the bottom of the concealed space, such as the ceiling, has a fire resistance rating at least equal to or greater than the fire partition.

- A high challenge fire wall is a wall used to subdivide a building with high fire challenge occupancies, having enhanced fire resistance ratings and enhanced appurtenance protection to prevent the spread of fire, and having structural stability.

Portions of structures that are subdivided by fire walls are permitted to be considered separate buildings, in that fire walls have sufficient structural stability to maintain the integrity of the wall in the event of the collapse of the building construction on either side of the wall.

== Characteristics ==
- Fire rating - Fire walls are constructed in such a way as to achieve a code-determined fire-resistance rating, thus forming part of a fire compartment's passive fire protection. Germany includes repeated impact force testing upon new fire wall systems. Other codes require impact resistance on a performance basis
- Design loads – Fire wall must withstand a minimum 5 lb/sq ft (24 kg/m^{2}), and additional seismic loads.
- Substation transformer firewalls are typically free-standing modular walls custom designed and engineered to meet application needs.
- Building fire walls typically extend through the roof and terminate at a code-determined height above it. They are usually finished off on the top with flashing (sheet metal cap) for protection against the elements.

=== Materials ===
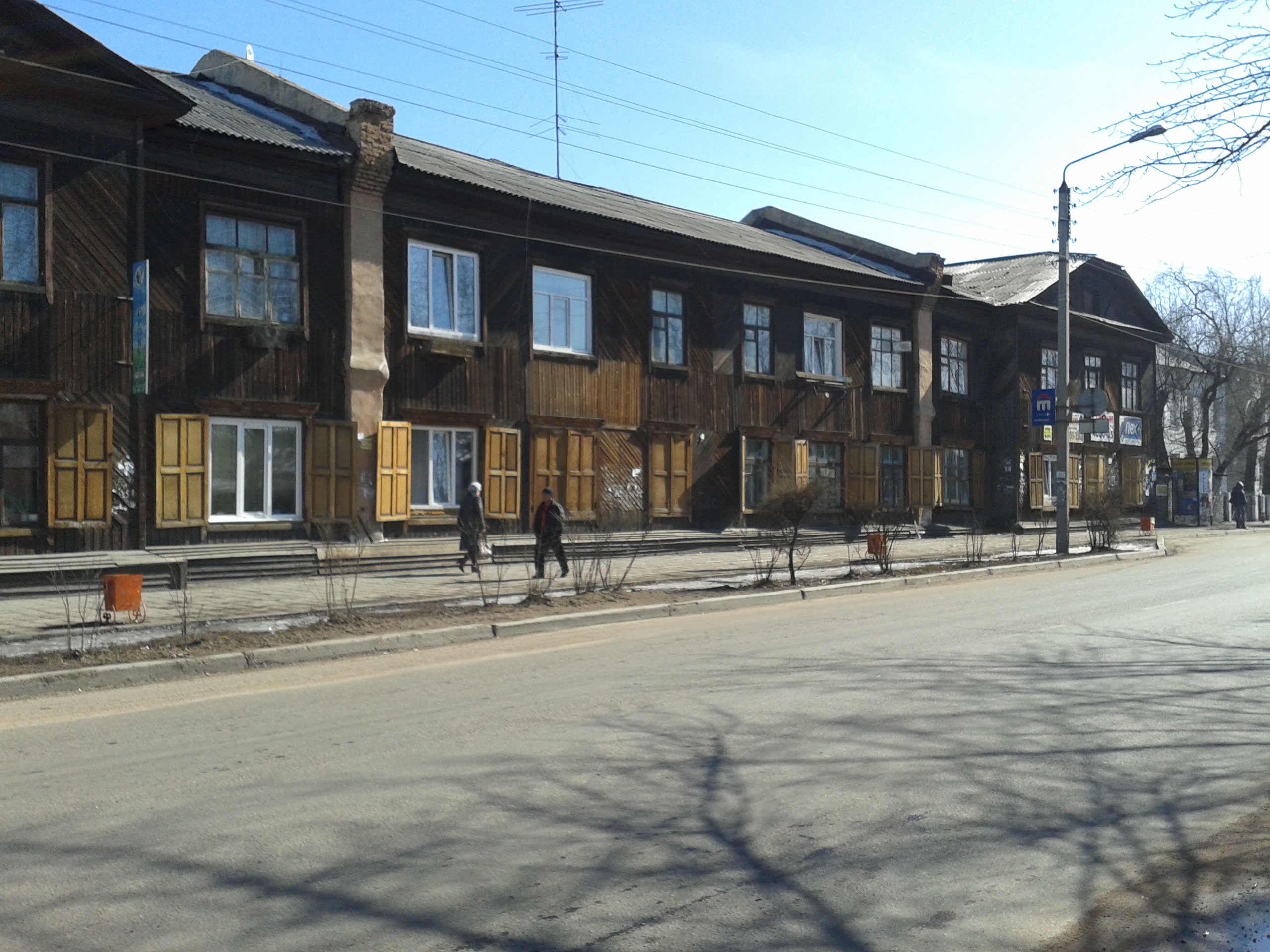
Firewalls between the old buildings in Ulan-Ude

- Building and structural fire walls in North America are usually made of concrete, concrete blocks, or reinforced concrete. Older fire walls, built prior to World War II, used brick materials.
- Fire barrier walls are typically constructed of drywall or gypsum board partitions with wood or metal framed studs.
- Penetrations – Penetrations through fire walls, such as for pipes and cables, must be protected with a listed firestop assembly designed to prevent the spread of fire through wall penetrations. Penetrations (holes) must not defeat the structural integrity of the wall, such that the wall cannot withstand the prescribed fire duration without threat of collapse.
- Openings – Other openings in fire walls, such as doors and windows, must also be fire-rated fire door assemblies and fire window assemblies.

== Performance-based design ==
Firewalls are used in varied applications that require specific design and performance specifications. Knowing the potential conditions that may exist during a fire is critical to selecting and installing an effective firewall. For example, a firewall designed to meet National Fire Protection Association, (NFPA), 221-09 section A.5.7 which indicates an average temperature of 800 °F (425 °C), is not designed to withstand higher temperatures such as would be present in higher challenge fires, and as a result would fail to function for the expected duration of the listed wall rating.

Performance based design takes into account the potential conditions during a fire. Understanding thermal limitations of materials is essential to using the correct material for the application. Laboratory testing is used to simulate fire scenarios and wall loading conditions. The testing results in an assigned listing number for the fire-rated assembly that defines the expected fire resistance duration and wall structural integrity under the tested conditions. Designers may elect to specify a listed fire wall assembly or design a wall system that would require performance testing to certify the expected protections before use of the designed fire-rated wall system.

== High-voltage transformer fire barriers ==
Fire barriers are used around large electrical transformers as firewalls. These barriers are used to isolate one transformer in case of fire or explosions, preventing fire propagation to neighboring transformers.

== See also ==
- Firewall (computing)
- Firebreak (forestry)
- Fireproofing
- Firestop (construction)
- Firewall (engine)
- Listing and approval use and compliance
- High-voltage transformer fire barriers
