= Commercial uses of armor =

Armor has been used in the military for a long period of time during the course of history but is becoming more frequently seen in the public sector as time passes. There are many different forms and ways that armor is being commercially used throughout the world today. The most popular and well-known uses are body and vehicle armor. There are other commercial uses including aircraft armor and armored glass.

== Commercial and cargo planes ==
Following the bombing of the Pan Am Flight 103 in 1988 the Transportation Security Laboratories have been developing ways to reduce the damage to an airplane by placing a hardened film around the cargo bay and overhead compartments. They have also changed the shape of the cargo bay to provide more security and to reduce the force of any explosion. To improve the circumstances in a case where an aircraft turbine engine fails, the Federal Aviation Administration (FAA) is working to design specific armor to protect the vital parts of the plane to assure safe flying until landing is accomplished. This armored barrier would prevent fragments from engine failure from damaging other sections of the airplane. High strength polymer fibers have been found to be the most effective material for this specific use.

== Armored glass ==
Armor Glass International, Inc. was founded by Michael Fjetland, BBA/JD, under the trademark Armor Glass® to provide security from breach of glass by natural disasters, explosions, burglars, hurricanes, tornadoes, hail, golf balls or other harmful events. One of the main products made by Amor Glass International is security film. This type of film is 8 mil thick, is rated for a Large Missile Impact (Level C 4.5 lb.) and is placed on the inside of a window or other source of glass, the weakest link of every building, to create a more durable and defensive layer. Studies have shown that breach of a window by wind-borne debris hurled by hurricane-force winds is what leads to roof uplift and structural collapse. This protective film is used on many buildings in Washington D.C. such as the Pentagon, Smithsonian, Congress, etc. but is also used commercially throughout the world for any person or company striving for extra protection against specific unpredictable encounters.

== Vehicle armor ==
Automobile armor should be customized to fit the client's needs based on type of car, threat level, and defensive options. When determining type of car the customer has many options as any automobile can be armored. However, the weight of the armor can vary from 500 to 2000 pounds requiring special suspension and engines upgrades to be installed. After the car type is chosen the customer is asked about their perceived threat level. This helps the manufactures to determine what ballistic protection level the car needs customized for (See also, International Armoring Corporation). Ballistic protection levels range Type IIa to Type IV and are governed by National Institute of Justice Standard 0108.01. Once the preliminary review is completed and the specifications are finalized the manufacture begin the project.

According to patent US 4352316 A* there are several steps when it comes to armoring a civilian automobile. First, the automobile is stripped of its interior. Second, door frames are rebuilt to include armor plating and bullet proof windows are added. Third, the vertical portions, top, and bottom of the automobile are enforced with armoring plating. Finally, the car's battery and engine are encased in armor plating. The objective of the plating is to prevent bullets from penetrating the automobile and entering into the passenger cabin. During the installation process various materials are used including; bulletproof glass, ballistic nylon, run flat inserts, and Lexan. Outside of the basic armoring package several defensive options are available to help improve the security of the automobile comprising; dual battery system, DVR security camera system, electric door handles, flashing front strobe lights, night vision systems, self-sealing fuel tank, and siren/loudspeaker system, etc.

== Economic impact ==
=== Economics of body armor ===
The US body armor industry is worth $802 million a year with a decrease just over nine percent in the last five years according to a market research done by IBISWorld. This is the result of the conclusion of the war in Afghanistan and the withdrawal of troops. There are currently around 80 companies in the US that are specializing in body armor from head to toe. The top four companies are said to control almost half of the market. The market is expected to come back from this 9% low due to needs for law enforcement and other private security firms. Just the body armor industry alone profits 39.3 million in profit. The military takes the majority with 72%, law enforcement take 14.2%, the commercial use has the remainder of the 13.8%. The report states that the use of robots has reduced the need for body armor in highly dangerous situations.

=== Economics of vehicle armor ===
In a report done by Ibisworld.com commercial uses of vehicle armor only share an 8% of the 7.2 billion dollar industry. The market has been on a steady decline, 12% over the past five years and expected to drop another 2% over the next five years. 68% of the market is taken by the military and government. It profits just under 1 billion dollars a year. Exports of commercial armored vehicles are on the rise the majority of the exports go the United Arab Emirates about 29%. Most of the other majority are exported to the middle east.

== See also ==
- Aramid
- Bulletproof glass
- Dragon Skin
- International Armoring Corporation
- Personal Armor
- Spider silk
- Armour
