= High-voltage transformer fire barriers =

Electrical transformer fire countermeasures

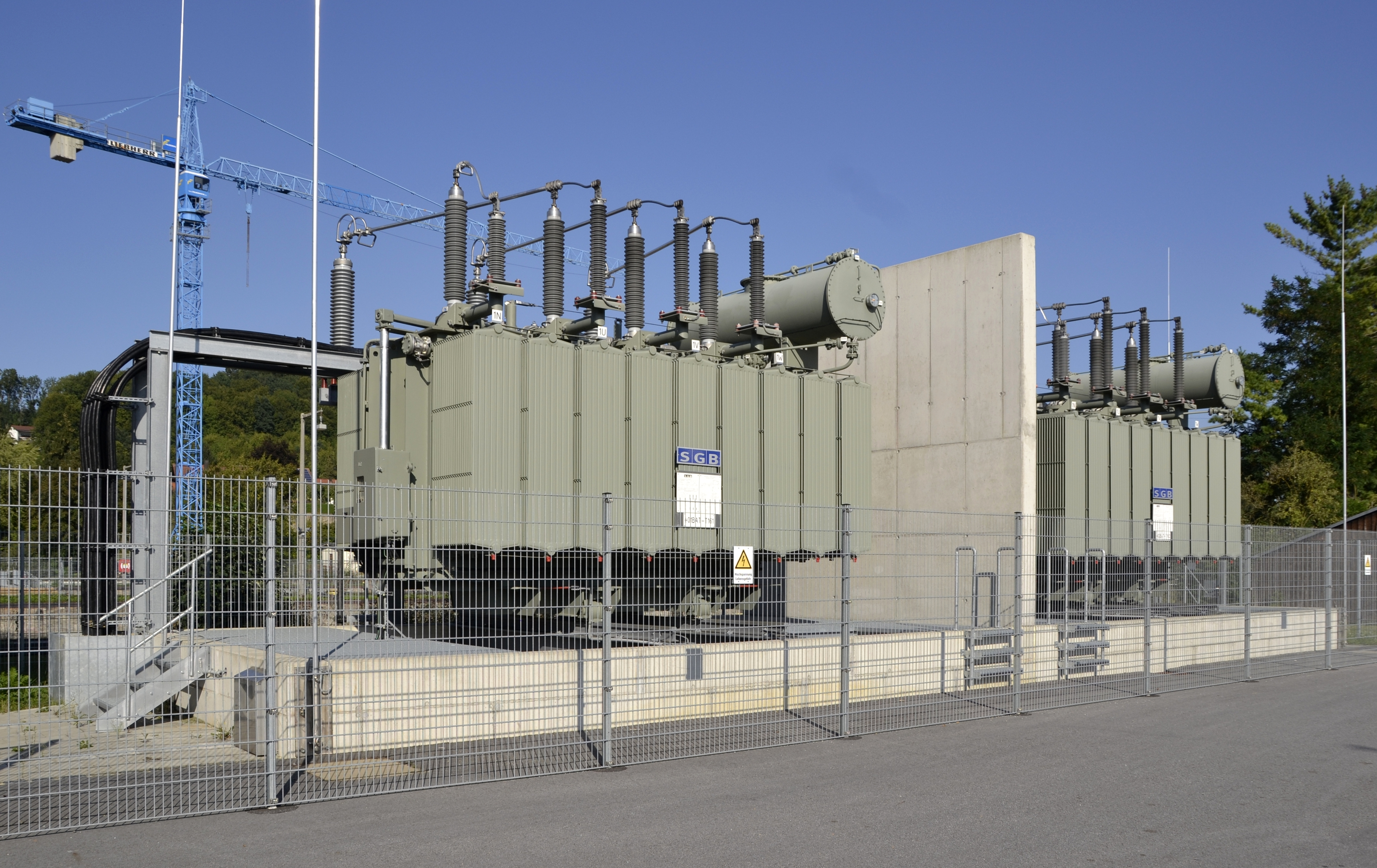
High-voltage transformers with bushings on top, separated by a fire barrier

High-voltage transformer fire barriers, also known as transformer firewalls, transformer ballistic firewalls, or transformer blast walls, are outdoor countermeasures against a fire or explosion involving a single transformer that would damage adjacent transformers. These barriers compartmentalize transformer fires and explosions involving combustible transformer oil.

High-voltage transformer fire barriers are typically located in electrical substations, but may also be attached to buildings, such as valve halls or manufacturing plants with large electrical distribution systems, such as pulp and paper mills. Outdoor transformer fire barriers that are attached at least on one side to a building are referred to as wing walls.

== Voluntary recommendations by NFPA 850 ==
The primary North American document that deals with outdoor high-voltage transformer fire barriers is NFPA 850. NFPA 850 outlines that outdoor oil-insulated transformers should be separated from adjacent structures and from each other by firewalls, spatial separation, or other approved means for the purpose of limiting the damage and potential spread of fire from a transformer failure.

=== Automatic fire suppression systems ===
Instead of a passive barrier, fire protection water spray systems are sometimes used to cool a transformer to prevent damage if exposed to radiation heat transfer from a fire involving oil released from another transformer that has failed.

=== Fast depressurization systems (FDS) ===
Mechanical systems designed to quickly depressurize the transformer oil tank after the occurrence of an electrical fault, known as fast depressurization systems (FDS), can minimize the chance that a transformer tank will rupture given a minor fault, but are not effective on major internal faults.

=== Alternatives to mineral-based transformer oil ===
Transformer oil is available in with sufficiently low combustibility that a fire will not continue after an internal electrical fault. These fluids include those approved by FM Global. FM Data Sheet 5-4 indicates different levels of protection depending on the type of fluid used. Alternatives include, but are not limited to, esters and silicone oil.

== See also ==
- Arc fault
- Cascading failure
- Electrical power distribution
- Fire test
- Firewall (construction)
- North American Electric Reliability Corporation
- Passive fire protection
