= Waynesboro Outlet Village =

Outdoor outlet mall in Waynesboro, Virginia

Coordinates: 38°3′22.3″N 78°56′33.6″W

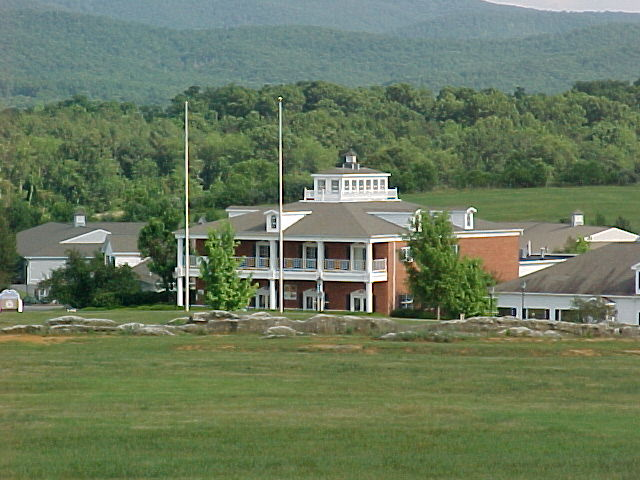
The Waynesboro Outlet Village as seen from US 340.

The Waynesboro Outlet Village, later rebranded Waynesboro Village, was an outdoor outlet mall in Waynesboro, Virginia, as one of Waynesboro's first attempts to make the town a shopping destination.

== Operation ==
In its heyday, the facility housed factory outlet stores and in later years housed a combination of outlet stores and offices for nonprofit organizations.

Between its 1987 opening and spring 2006 closing, retail tenants included Bannister Shoe, Bass Shoes, Bugle Boy, Capacity, Christmas Goose, Corning-Revere, Crafters Corner, Fannie Farmer, L'eggs-Hanes-Bali, Liz Claiborne, Petal Pushers, Sam's Factory Outlet, The Paper Factory, The Ribbon Outlet, Royal Dalton, Tile Visions, Virginia MetalCrafters, and Westport Ltd. Non-traditional tenants have included the Artisans Center of Virginia, Borg-Warner Services, Computer Redistribution Team, Dance Augusta, Northrop Grumman Information Technology and One Child at a Time (OCAT).

== Demolition ==
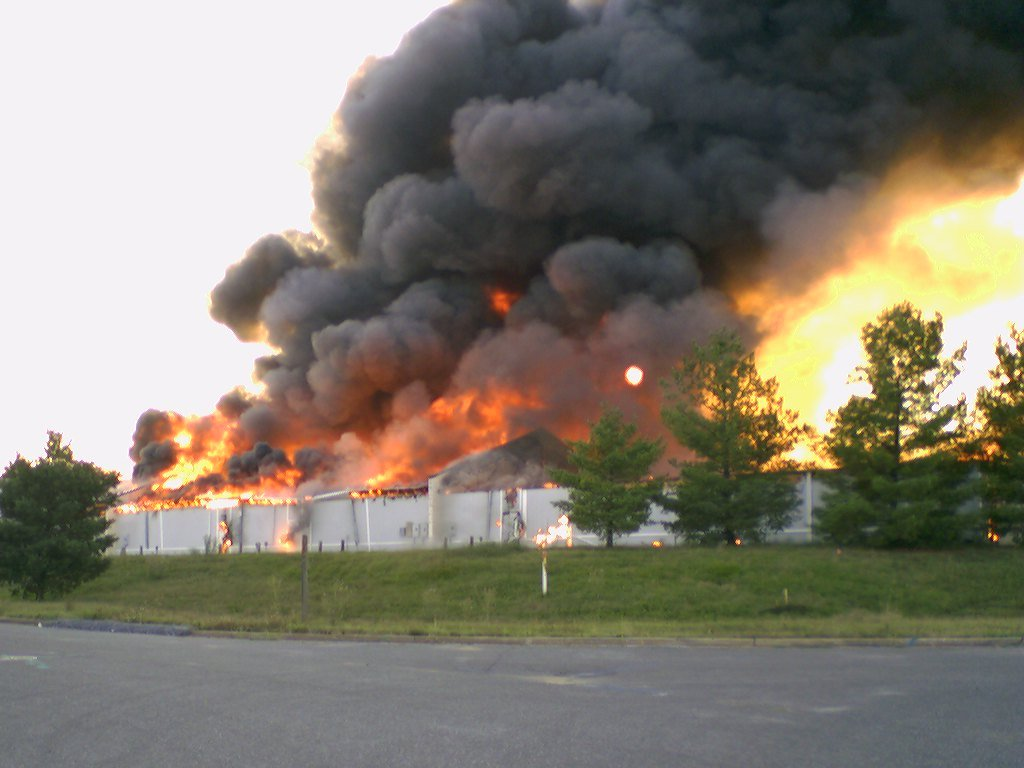
Building 7 burns to the ground as part of a fire department training exercise.

The Waynesboro Outlet Village was demolished during August 2006 to make way for a new retail center, with the first new tenants planned to open in the fall of 2007. Existing tenants were required to vacate their spaces by June 19, 2006.

While some buildings in the complex were demolished conventionally, others were burned to the ground by the Waynesboro Fire Department, which conducted training exercises in the buildings. Former Fire chief Charles Scott described the situation as "win-win", as the fire department is able to conduct valuable training, while the new developers are able to save on demolition costs.

== Redevelopment ==
The facility that replaced the Waynesboro Outlet Village is called "Waynesboro Town Center". Waynesboro city officials confirmed in June 2006 that the shopping center would be anchored by Target and Kohl's. Target opened on October 9, 2007 as the first of several new stores.

== See also ==
- Dead mall
