= Military of the Zhou dynasty =

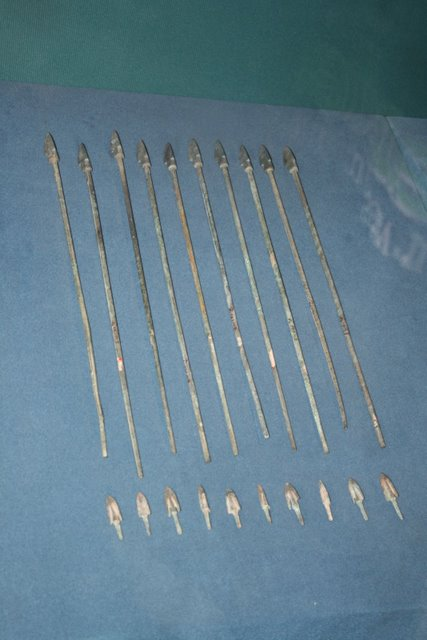
Spring and Autumn period bronze arrows

The military of the Zhou dynasty were the forces fighting under the Zhou dynasty (Chinese: 周朝; pinyin: Zhōu cháo), a royal dynasty of China ruling from c. 1046 BC until 256 BC. Under the Zhou, these armies were able to expand China's territory and influence to all of the North China plain. Equipped with bronze weapons, bows, and armor, these armies won victories against the sedentary Dongyi to the East and South, which were the main direction of expansion, as well as defending the western border against the nomadic incursions of the Xirong. However, after the collapse of the Zhou dynasty in 771 BC when the Xirong captured its capital Haojing, China collapsed into a plethora of small states who warred frequently with each other. The competition between these states would eventually produce the professional armies that marked the Imperial Era of China.

== Warrior class ==
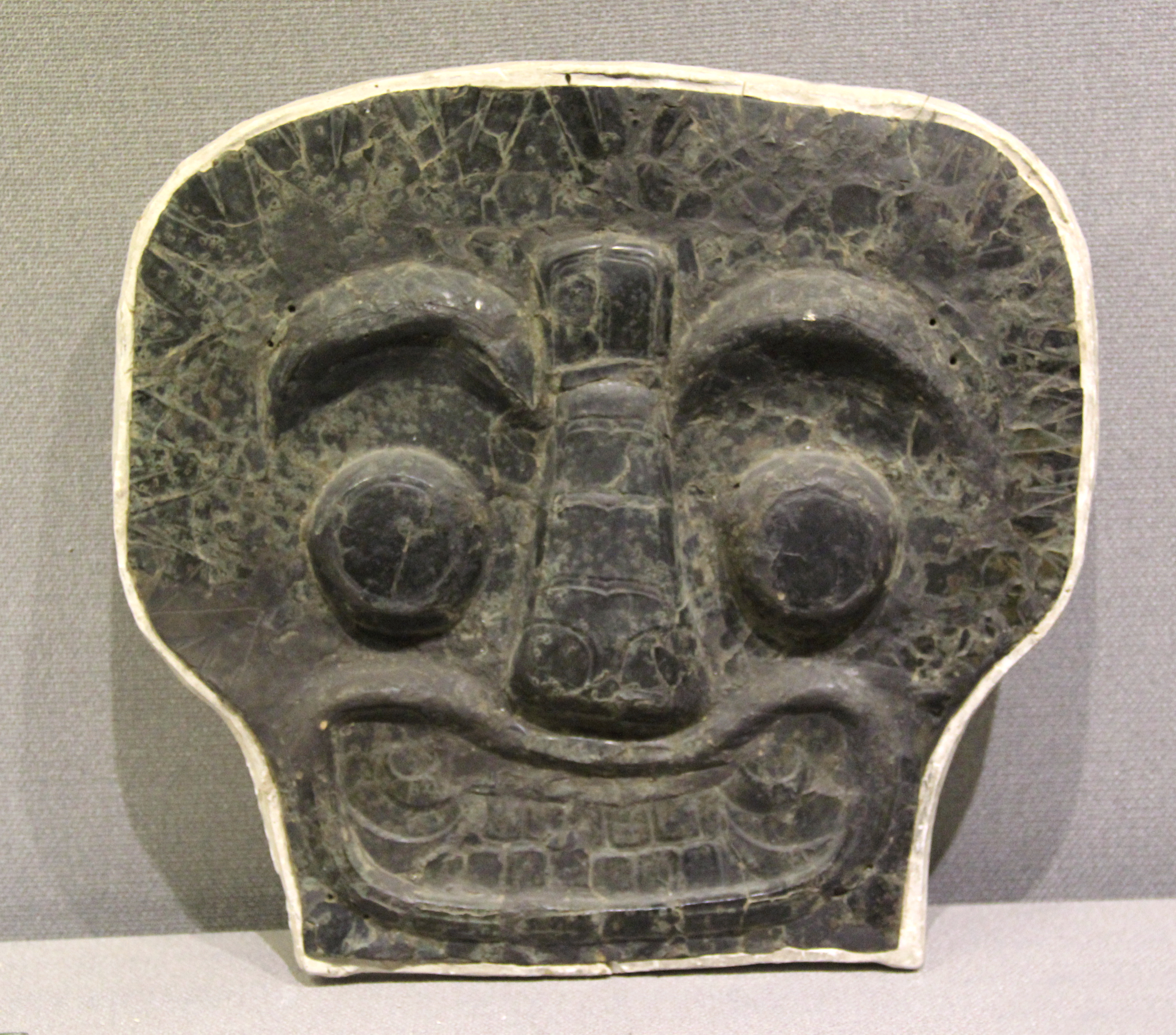
Western Zhou Period bronze armour decoration

During the Western Zhou and early Eastern Zhou eras, warfare was seen as an aristocratic affair, complete with protocols that may be compared to the chivalry of the European knight. The shi knights had a strict code of chivalry. Since the Zhou warriors consulted oracles to ensure that wars strictly conformed to heavenly will and righteousness, the Zhou placed great importance on obeying commands in battle regardless of possible losses in life and property. However, this religious aura of legitimacy also meant that the Zhou warriors considered deception in warfare to be a disgrace on their ancestral lineages, and sacrilegious warriors would become outcasts from their clan. Examples of this code include the battle of Zheqiu, 420 BC, in which the shi Hua Bao shot at and missed another shi Gongzi Cheng, and just as he was about to shoot again, Gongzi Cheng said that it was unchivalrous to shoot twice without allowing him to return a shot. Hua Bao lowered his bow and was subsequently shot dead, or in 624 BC when a disgraced shi from the State of Jin led a suicidal charge of chariots to redeem his reputation, which turned the tide of the battle. In the Battle of Bi, 597 BC, the routing chariot forces of Jin were bogged down in mud, but pursuing enemy troops stopped to help them get dislodged and allowed them to escape. States would not attack other states while mourning its ruler. Ruling houses would not be completely exterminated so descendants would be left to honor their ancestors. During the Spring and Autumn period (771–479 BC), Duke Xiang of Song, when being advised to attack enemy Chu forces while the enemy army was fording a river, refused and waited for the Chu army to form formation. After Xiang lost the battle and was being rebuked by his ministers of war, he responded: "The gentleman does not inflict a second wound, nor does he capture those with gray hair. On campaigns, the ancients did not obstruct those in a narrow pass. Even though I am but the remnant of a destroyed state, I will not drum an attack when the other side has not yet drawn up its ranks." His minister retorted, "My lord does not know battle. If the mighty enemy is in a defile or with his ranks not drawn up, this is Heaven assisting us", signifying that by the Spring and Autumn period such attitudes on chivalric honor was dying out.

All residents of the guo (a state's capital area) were members of the military aristocracy of shi or artisans; no farmers resided in the capital area. Instead, farmers lived in the surrounding countryside (鄙). Only the best among the farmers would be chosen to serve in the military by being selected for promotion to the warrior class. Only those of shi rank and higher, residing in the cities, had the right to participate in combat; freedmen and slaves, who lived outside city walls, could serve only in logistic roles.

Zhou warriors developed a code of ceremonies surrounding their participation in the military life. The Zhou concept of the Six Arts of a refined gentleman included archery and chariotry, while hunting ceremonies featured as military training. Wars began with a ceremony to "pledge resolution", celebrations for the triumphant return of soldiers included a welcome ceremony and a "slave-offering" ceremony, and defeats in battle were commemorated with a crying ceremony. Other military-based ceremonies included a "soldier-borrowing" ceremony, a "route-borrowing" ceremony, and an "alliance-forming" ceremony between lords. Wars also featured public duels pre-arranged at a specified time and place.

== Western Zhou ==
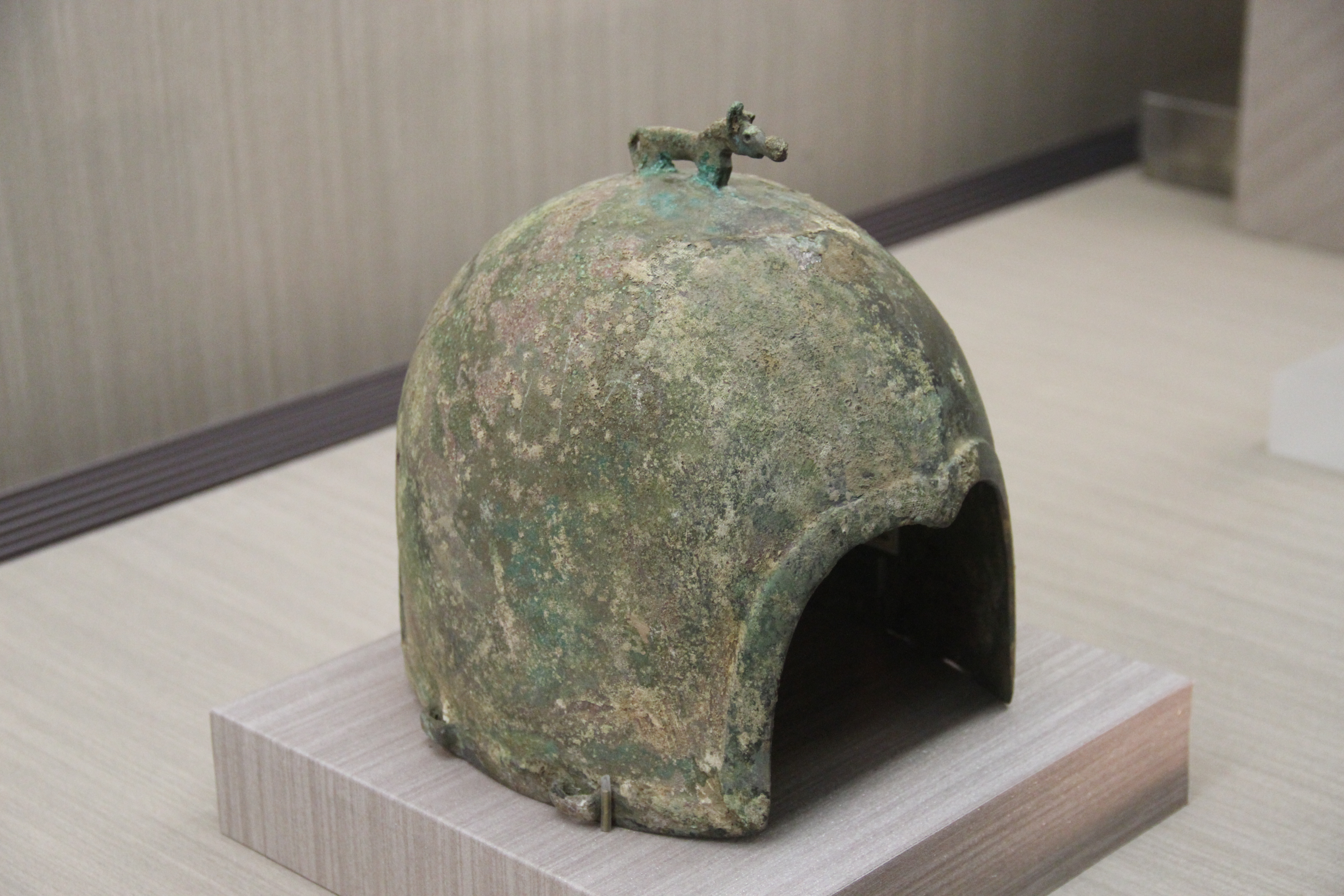
Zhou bronze helmet, 8th century BC

Early Chinese armies were relatively small affairs, composed of levies dependent upon the king or the feudal lord of their home state. These armies were relatively ill-equipped. While organized military forces existed along with the state, few records remain of these early armies. Armies were centered around the chariot-riding nobility, who played a role akin to the European knight as they were the main fighting force of the army. Bronze weapons such as spears and swords were the main equipment of both the infantry and charioteers. Initially, these armies were ill-trained and haphazardly supplied, meaning that they could not campaign for more than a few months and often had to give up their gains due to lack of supplies.

The royal army of the Western Zhou consisted of two divisions, the Six Armies of the West (西六師), based in the Zhou capital in the Wei River valley, and the Eight armies of Chengzhou (成周八師) based in the eastern capital Chengzhou. One special unit mentioned in inscriptions is the wanghang (王行) which may be a force under the King's direct command when personally on campaign. These armies differed from the European feudal model in that the soldiers of the Zhou king did not seem to have limits on their term of service; Zhou literature mentions campaigns lasting as long as three years. Also, unlike the European royal retinues of a few dozen to a couple of hundred knights, the Eight Armies and Six Armies were very large and complex standing organisations that included officials such as situ (land supervisor) and sigong (supervisor of construction), and oversaw orchards, marshes, pastures and farmland — likely for logistic purposes. Zhou kings funded and managed these armies, rather than leave the knights to equip themselves on the income of their fiefs as in European feudalism.

Military command was divided according to aristocratic rank, and power was shared among the feudal lords. Vassal states were entitled to smaller military forces parallel to the royal court, with large states entitled to three armies, medium states having two, and small states with one. Top ministers also had their personal armies which were limited to 100 riders and were similarly expected to partake in military campaigns and fiefs, such as the ministerial role taishi. However, apart from the top rung of leadership, the lower official posts were beginning to be separated along civil-military lines. The position of huchen was in command of the infantry defences of the royal court, shishi were the local town garrison commanders, while sima was the generic title used by officials at every level of the army, in charge of conscription and taxes. Soldiers were drafted from the urban dwellers, which consisted of the clans of the Zhou ruling class, and were required to serve one out of every four seasons in a year. Nobles would form the war chariot core of the Zhou army.

Apart from the royal armies, regional states also maintained their own forces. The presence of the Eight Armies stationed in the East was intended to keep the regional states in line. Unlike the Shang, the Zhou were determined to assert their governance over subjugated peoples. These regional states were originally assigned to royal family members to monitor the conquered Shang people, but gradually drifted away from royal authority. Military assistance that the regional states provided to the Zhou was dependent on the cooperativeness of local rulers and the ability of the King. There were also garrison troops located in certain places. Private armies of noble lineages in the royal domain also appeared in records from the late Western Zhou Period.

The early Western Zhou was marked by rapid expansion: bronze inscriptions record the launch of major military expeditions into the lower Ordos, the Shandong peninsula "Eastern Barbarians", where they were successful at establishing a stronghold. These expeditions were nearly all conducted as joint operations by the royal and state armies. Towards the beginning of the mid-Western Zhou, King Zhao of Zhou turned his attention to the south's Yangtze river valley where it suffered difficulties and put an end to the period of expansion. The fourth King, Zhao of Zhou (975-957 BC) suffered a severe defeat in the Zhou–Chu War against the State of Chu on the Han River, where the entire Six Armies of the West were lost and had to be rebuilt. This led to the end of Zhou dominance in the area as opponents became emboldened and frequently challenged its strength.

=== Equipment and external influences ===
While chariots had been previously used in battle, only in the Western Zhou era were they used in large numbers. The Zhou conquest of the Shang may have been linked to their use of the chariot. Under the Shang, chariots were extremely ornate and used by high ranking elite as command and archery platforms, but under the Zhou, chariots were simpler and more common. The ratio of chariots to foot soldiers under the Shang is estimated to be 1 to 30, while under the Zhou it is estimated to be 1 to 10. However, this was still limited as compared to the 1 to 5 in Ancient Egypt.

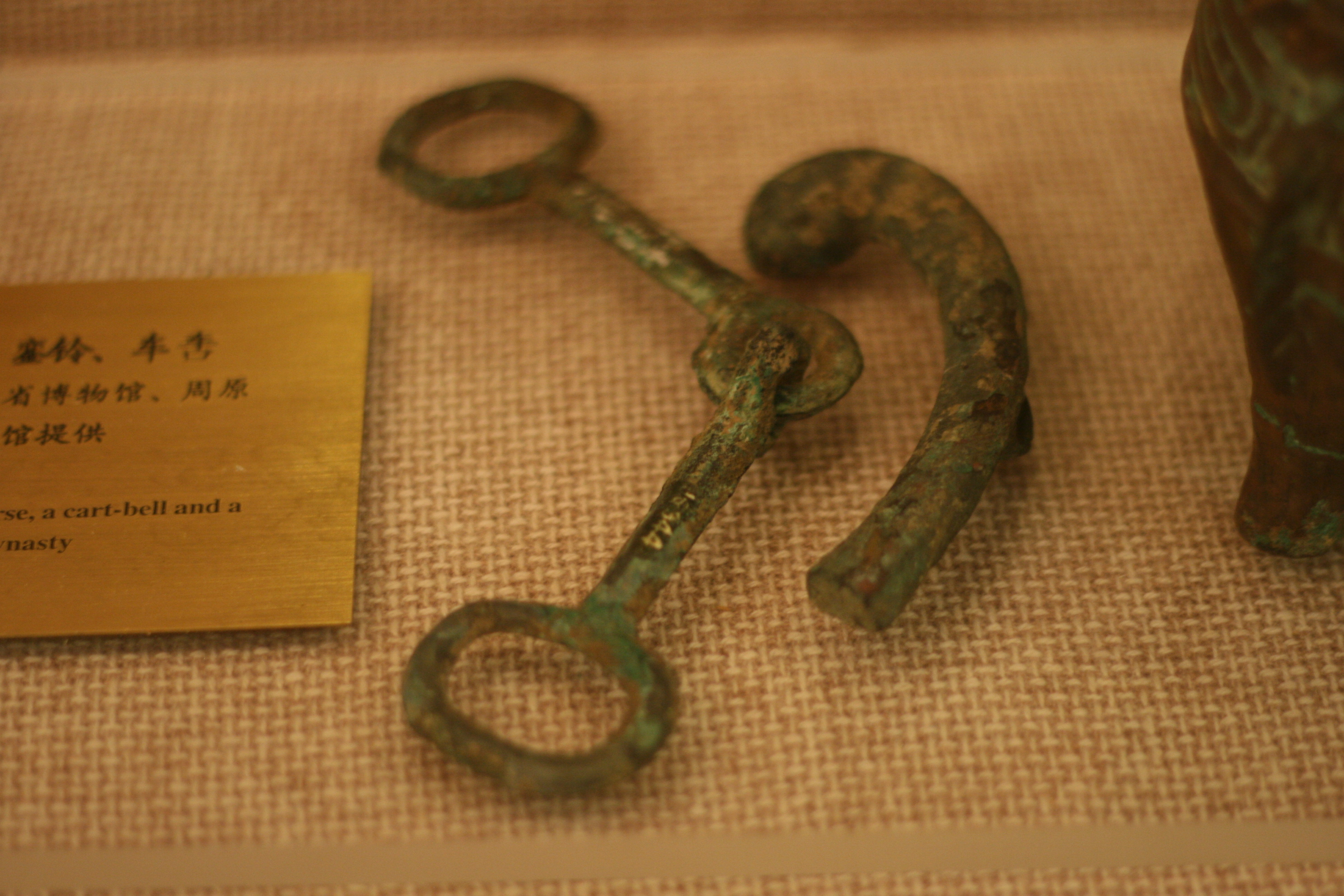
Western Zhou horse bit and cheekplate

Recent archaeological finds demonstrate similarities between horse burials of the Shang and Zhou dynasties with the steppe populations in the west, such as the Saka and Wusun. Other possible cultural influences resulting from contact with these Iranic people of Central Asia in this period may include fighting styles, head-and-hooves burials, art motifs and myths.

Since the Western Zhou (as well as the Shang) did not have direct contact with the horse herders of the Mongolian plateau, their supply of horses came from the diverse peoples of a "bridging", "northern zone" stretching from the Hexi Corridor across the Ordos Plateau and Yan Mountains. The Zhou formed alliances with the polities on the border of this arc, which provided horses to make up for the unsuitability of the Yellow River valley for horse breeding. The Zhou also valued these hybrid "Rong" cultures for their skills with fighting and horses, examples being the Ba at Dahekou in Yicheng county and the Peng at Hengshui. The continued influence of these northern cultures could be seen in the Zhou's adoption of steppe-style rod-shaped cheek pieces for their horse harnesses in the tenth century BC, as well as steppe-style rein hooks, curved knives, chisels, socketed axes, forged bronzes, antler armour, and beaded ornaments.

The Zhou army also included "barbarian" troops such as the Di people. King Hui of Zhou married a princess of the Hong Di as a sign of appreciation for the importance of the Di troops. King Xiang of Zhou also married a Di princess after receiving Di military support.

== Spring and Autumn Period ==
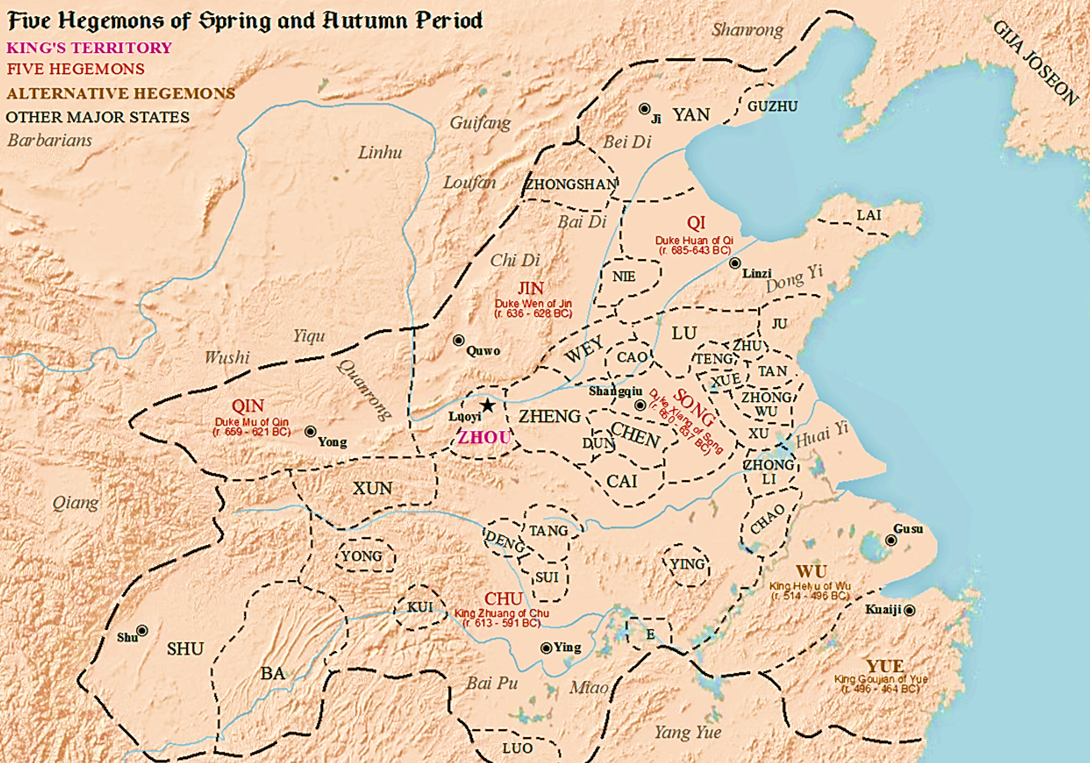
Map of the Five Hegemons during the Spring and Autumn period of Zhou Dynasty

With the end of the Western Zhou, the Zhou court moved east to Luoyang, resulting in the loss of its direct control of the Wei River valley, the Royal court's primary source of revenue. The smaller Luo River Valley in the east was too small to support an extensive army and the Six Armies of the West and Eight Armies of Chengzhou disappeared from prominence. However, the shifting of the royal court and other aristocratic lineages into the east intensified conflict over resources, later drawing in peripheral powers (i.e. Qi, Lu, Yan, Jin, Chu) into interstate wars due to their connections with the inner states.

Interstate relations originated in the feudal system of Western Zhou, whereby leaders who also held the title of Son of Heaven of the states were granted hierarchical titles from the King of Zhou. Within a few years after the beginning of the Spring and Autumn period, these ranks lost their practical significance. Diplomacy came to be dictated by the security interests of the states rather than by ceremony. Although the Zhou king remained the supreme ritual office through this period, royal representatives were sidelined at interstate conferences.

The institution of hegemon (霸), created to designate the one privileged to command campaigns on behalf of the Zhou king, helped to stabilize the Zhou ecumene in the 7th and 6th centuries BC and unify the states against invading tribes. The interstate conferences convened by the hegemons helped to maintain peace, such as the four decades-long truce between the states after the Shangqiu conference in 546 BC. The hegemon order declined with the rise of the southern peripheral kingdoms Wu and Yue in 500 BC. Although the Zhou royal institutions had become politically impotent, there was little attempt to alter the political thought underpinning the state system until the late 6th century BC. For much of the Spring and Autumn period, interstate politics were somewhat overshadowed by the internal conflicts within states, among the aristocratic lineages and the state rulers.

=== Organisation and culture ===
Some of these newly subjugated areas were initially governed according to the prevailing Zhou institution of granting them as fiefs ("secondary feudalization"), except that they were subordinate to regional rulers instead of the Zhou King. However, the xian and later the jun, directly administered border districts, also appeared in the Spring and Autumn Period's recently conquered military frontier zones. Xian were smaller in size while jun were more sparsely populated, but both were closely associated with warfare. Soldiers of the State of Jin were identified in the Zuo Zhuan according to the xian they were mobilised from.

Relatively little is known of the internal organisation of these state forces, apart from the reforms of Guan Zhong in the State of Qi. Prime Minister Guan divided his state into twenty-one districts (鄉), six of which were groupings of artisans and merchants and fifteen which were controlled by aristocrats to recruit troops. Of the fifteen, five were directly governed by the state ruler. Each district would field a battalion (旅) of 2,000 men including 40 chariot crews under the command of the district governor (鄉良人). Running parallel to the military divisions were administrative divisions: a district was divided into ten Captaincies (連) which each supported one division (卒) of 200 men including four chariots; each captaincy was divided into four Li (里) each raising a bicentury (戎) of 50 soldiers and one chariot; a Li consisted of ten circuits (軌) of five households each. Every circuit fielded a band (伍) of five soldiers. The entire state fielded three armies of 10,000 soldiers and 200 chariots each. Guan Zhong also abolished the previous system of restricting military service only to the urban shi class, and instead created a new class for full-time professional soldiers in service, who lived together on a permanent basis and focused exclusively on military skills.

The subjugation of states still remained the purpose of the Spring and Autumn Period warfare (chariot battles commanded by aristocrats). Many prominent battles of the seventh and sixth centuries BC focused on the acquisition of more allies among the smaller states, not conquest of land. According to the Zuo Zhuan, the purpose of war was to impose the higher status of one state over the other, maintaining or increasing the ancestral honour. This meant that all wars had to commence at the ancestral temple and end at the same place. While honour could derive from a ruler disciplining his followers, it could also derive from battlefield heroism and pursuing vendettas against perceived insults. Hence, there was a clash between the former, which represented the state order, and the latter, which represented individual acts of bravery, even if those acts endangered the state interest as a whole. The state recognised individual honour by legal reforms to grant new positions to heroic individuals, but personal honour also forced the state to organise the followers of each hereditary official as separate army units. The expansion of each army unit corresponded to rewarding the personal courage of commanders, even if those acts of bravery jeopardised the state.

=== Equipment and tactics ===
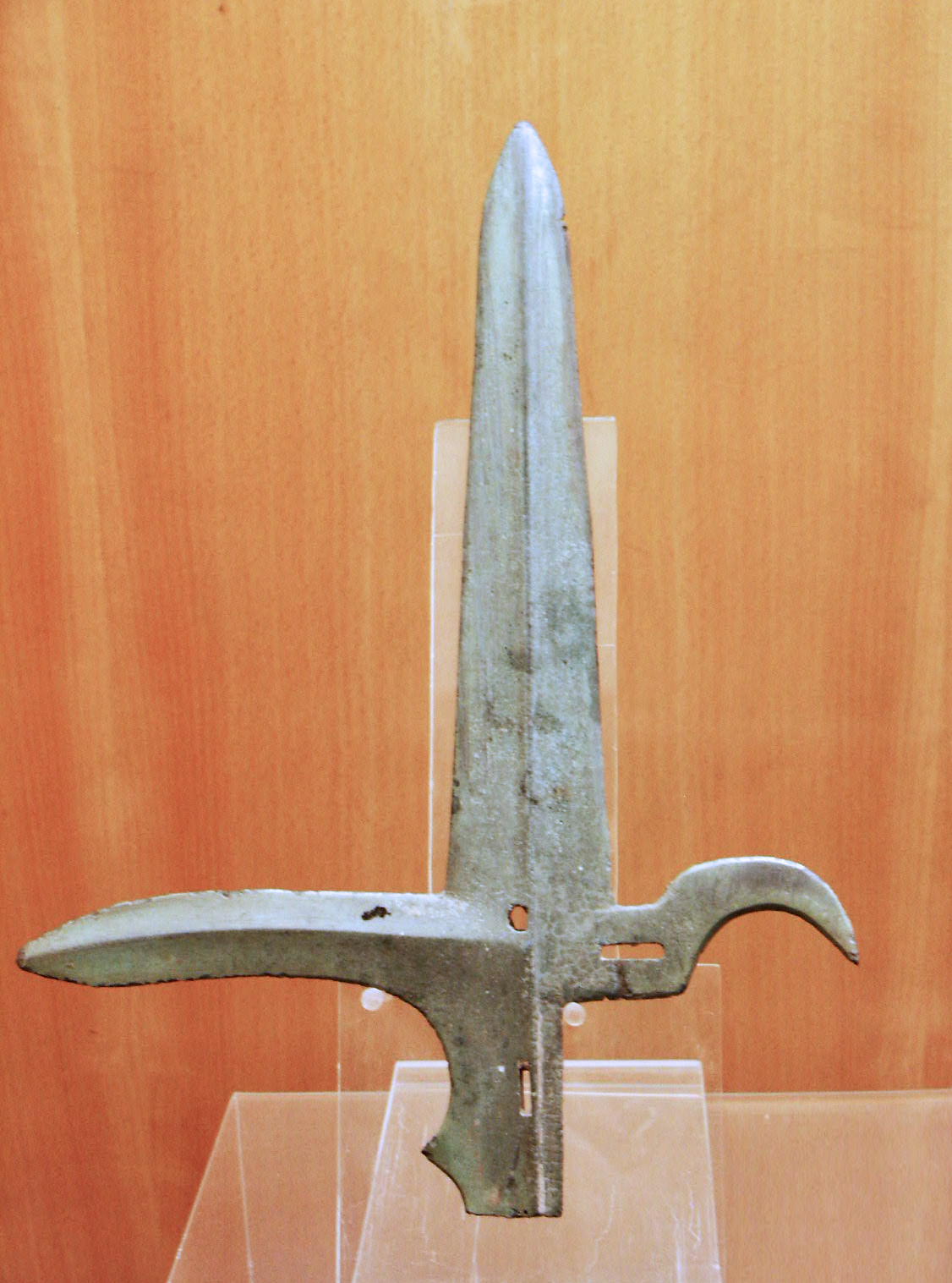
Eastern Zhou bronze halberd

In the Spring and Autumn period, archery switched from targeted shooting to massed volleys. Spring and Autumn period chariots were covered with thick leather armour and had a shorter pole than earlier models, but still carried the traditional crew of driver, archer and striker, all aristocratic warriors. The chariots also carried a drum, bell, gong and flag to signal commands to the infantry. The chariot was the core of a combined arms company or zi, alongside three infantry platoons (liang) of 72 footmen in total, and a supply cart crewed by 25 men. The pure infantry companies were composed of 100 footmen divided into 4 platoons of 25 men each, each divided into 5-man squads (wu). Five companies comprised a battalion (lu), and five battalions made up a shi or division. An army (jun) consisted five divisions, and a field army could range from 3 to 5 armies in size.

By the end of the Spring and Autumn period, cavalry had appeared on the battlefield, and the chariot would gradually revert to being a command platform in the course of the ensuing Warring States period.

== See also ==
- Zhou dynasty
- Western Zhou
- Eastern Zhou
- Spring and Autumn Period
- Military history of China before 1912

== Bibliography ==
- Krech, Volkhard; Steinicke, Marian (2011), Dynamics in the History of Religions between Asia and Europe: Encounters, Notions, and Comparative Perspectives, Brill, ISBN 978-9-004-22535-0
