= Bioinspired armor =

Armor inspired by natural microstructures

Bioinspired armor are materials that were inspired by the composition, and most importantly, the microstructures commonly found in nature's natural defense mechanisms. These microstructures have been evolved by organisms to protect themselves from exterior forces, such as predatory attacks. These materials and their microstructures are optimized to withstand large forces. By taking inspiration from these materials we can design armor that has better penetration resistance and force dissipation properties than previously possible.

Nature uses abundantly available materials to develop structures that have the most efficiently aimed mechanical properties. By examining the microstructures produced in nature, scientists can engineer these structures with more optimal materials to produce the most mechanically robust version of these structures. Biological/Bioinspired armor is specifically aimed at producing protective materials by optimizing naturally occurring defensive materials.

This article will cover common types of defensive materials observed in nature, how these microstructures contribute to the impressive material properties, and how scientists have used this knowledge to develop novel protective materials.

== Function and microstructure ==
=== Armor for High-Velocity Collision Protection ===
==== Nacre ====
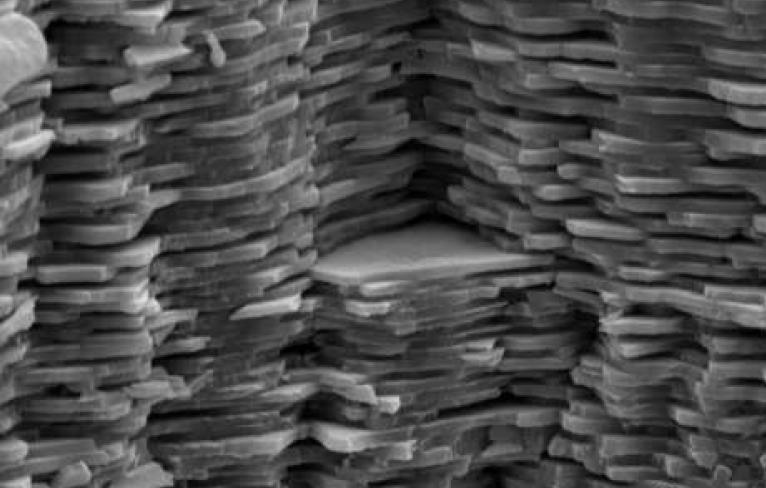
Microstructure of nacre aragonite tiles

Nacre is the composite biological material that makes up the shell of mollusks, featuring high strength and toughness. Layers of nacre work together to protect soft-bodied organisms from external loads, mainly including predatory attack and underwater currents, and can thus dissipate a large amount of energy during impact.

The hierarchical structure of nacre has been observed on many length scales, from the microscale to the nanoscale. On the microscale, the structure of nacre is akin to "brick and mortar": composed of long, thin brittle plates in a polygonal shape held together by a soft and flexible polymer. The mineral tiles are composed of aragonite, a polymorph of calcium carbonate, and are held together with a polymer of chitin and asparagine- rich protein. The aragonite tiles are 0.5 um thick, while the biopolymer layer is 50 nm. The arrangement of these tiles affects the mechanical properties of the nacre. Columnar nacre occurs when the tablets stack, creating regions of aragonite platelet overlap. Sheet nacre occurs when the tablets are arranged randomly between adjacent layers. Other features on the nanoscale, such as mineral bridges and asperities contribute to the high fracture resistance of nacre.

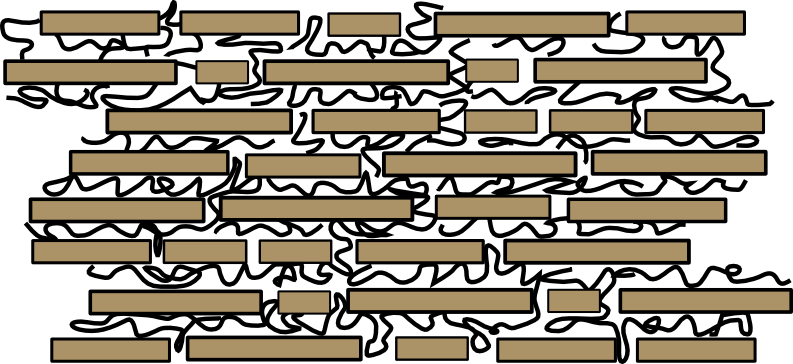
Microscopic structure of nacre

Nacre has been studied for potential applications in human armor. Engineered nacre-like composites have been shown to possess improved ballistic-penetration resistance compared to monolithic armor of the same area and density.

==== Turtle Shells ====
A turtle shell is a bio-composite consisting of a keratin-coated dorsal shell, or carapace, and a flat interior made of cancellous bone sandwiched between thin layers of cortical bone. The flat, bony configuration allows for significant weight reduction, thereby resulting in higher stiffness, strength, and toughness-to-weight ratios. This design renders the shell particularly effective against sharp, high-strain assaults, providing vital protection from predators such as alligators, jaguars, and birds.

Soft collagenous tissue that joins adjacent interdigitating bone plates, called sutures or interdigitating sutures, allows a turtle to respond to a variety of different loading regimes. Turtle shells were considered to be biological polymers before synthetic polymers were developed, and were thus one of the first natural analogs of early man-made armor.

=== Armor for Low-Velocity Blunt Impact Loading ===
A key application for biological-inspired armor is protection against low-velocity blunt-impact loading. Blunt impact loading refers to the direct contact of a blunt object on a body, resulting in physical force or trauma. It involves the transfer of kinetic energy, without penetration, and usually can result in compression, deformation or material fracture. Common examples would include sports injuries (impacts that result in concussions), assaults (punches, kicks), or falls. Many instances in nature provide organisms with an ability to sustain these loads, and hence provide models for biomimetic armors.

==== Hooves ====
Bovine and equine hooves are highly studied examples of blunt impact loading and shock absorption in nature. This is primarily because the hooves act as a natural energy absorber for animals such as horses and cattle with high force and velocity gait patterns.

Structure

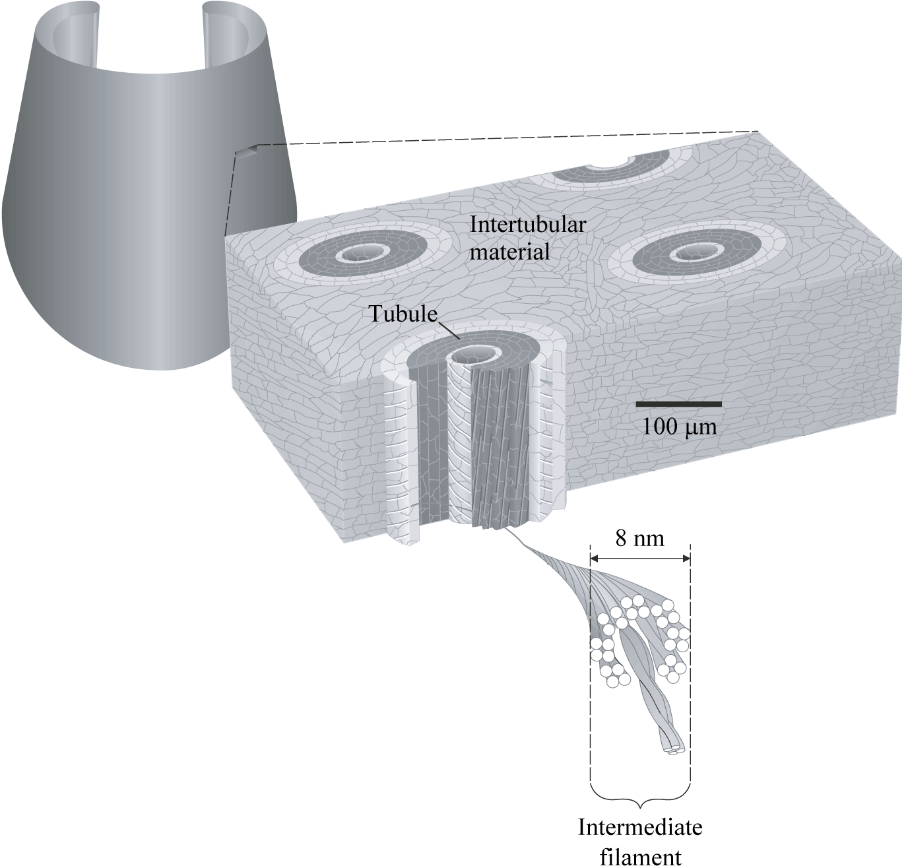
Hierarchal structure of hoof

Both bovine and equine hooves are made of the protein α-Keratin. α-Keratin is a structural, fibrous protein, the same one found in our hair and nails. The keratin molecules are held together by H-bonding and disulfide cross-linked bonds, which enhance the rigidity of the protein. α-Keratin chains twist together to form coiled-coil dimers. Coiled dimers bind with other coiled dimers to produce photo filaments, which further bind to form a photo fibril, then eventually an intermediate filament (IF). Within the outer wall of the hoof, are tubule structures oriented parallel to the leg (220x140 um, 50 um medullary cavity). Keratin intermediate filaments are organized as circular lamellae that surround these tubules.

Properties

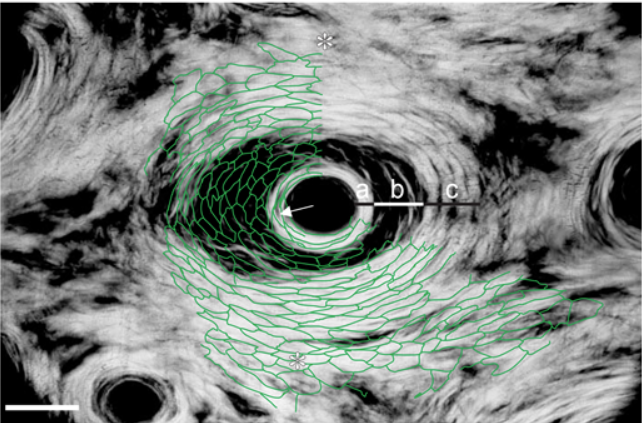
Polarized light photograph of a hoof cross section shows keratin lamellae surrounding hoof tubule

Many of the mechanical properties associated with hooves are due to the presence of tubules. The layers of tubules with their lamellar keratin surroundings provide excellent crack deflection and fracture toughness. When a crack is introduced into a material, it will continue to propagate until it hits a new interface. Hooves have layers of keratin IFs surrounding each tubule, each in slightly changing orientations, creating multiple interfaces that the crack will "bump" into, and thus makes the hoof a highly fracture-resistant material. The high fiber alignment and density of keratin as well as the longitudinal orientation of the tubules helps with energy absorption from blunt loading. Finally, the intratubular matrix within the tubules of the hooves is less stiff and dense than that surrounding it, reducing the weight of the hoof. All these properties help hooves support large compressive and impact loads while providing shock absorption from the impact, and make for promising impact loading models.

==== Horns ====
Horns, such as those found in goats, buffalo, and rhinoceroses are another keratin based structure that may provide inspiration for biological armor. Given that horns serve as a defense mechanism for these animals, these structures are well able to withstand significant impacts.

Structure

Horn has a very similar structure to hoof, as they are both composed of α-Keratin. The structural makeup of these types of horns involves a lamellar keratin structure, with microtubules radially oriented. These tubules are much larger than those found in hooves, with exact dimensions depending on the species, but are also surrounded by keratin IF lamella. This gives the horns an ability to maintain stiffness in tension while still dissipating kinetic energy from compressive forces and impact.

Properties

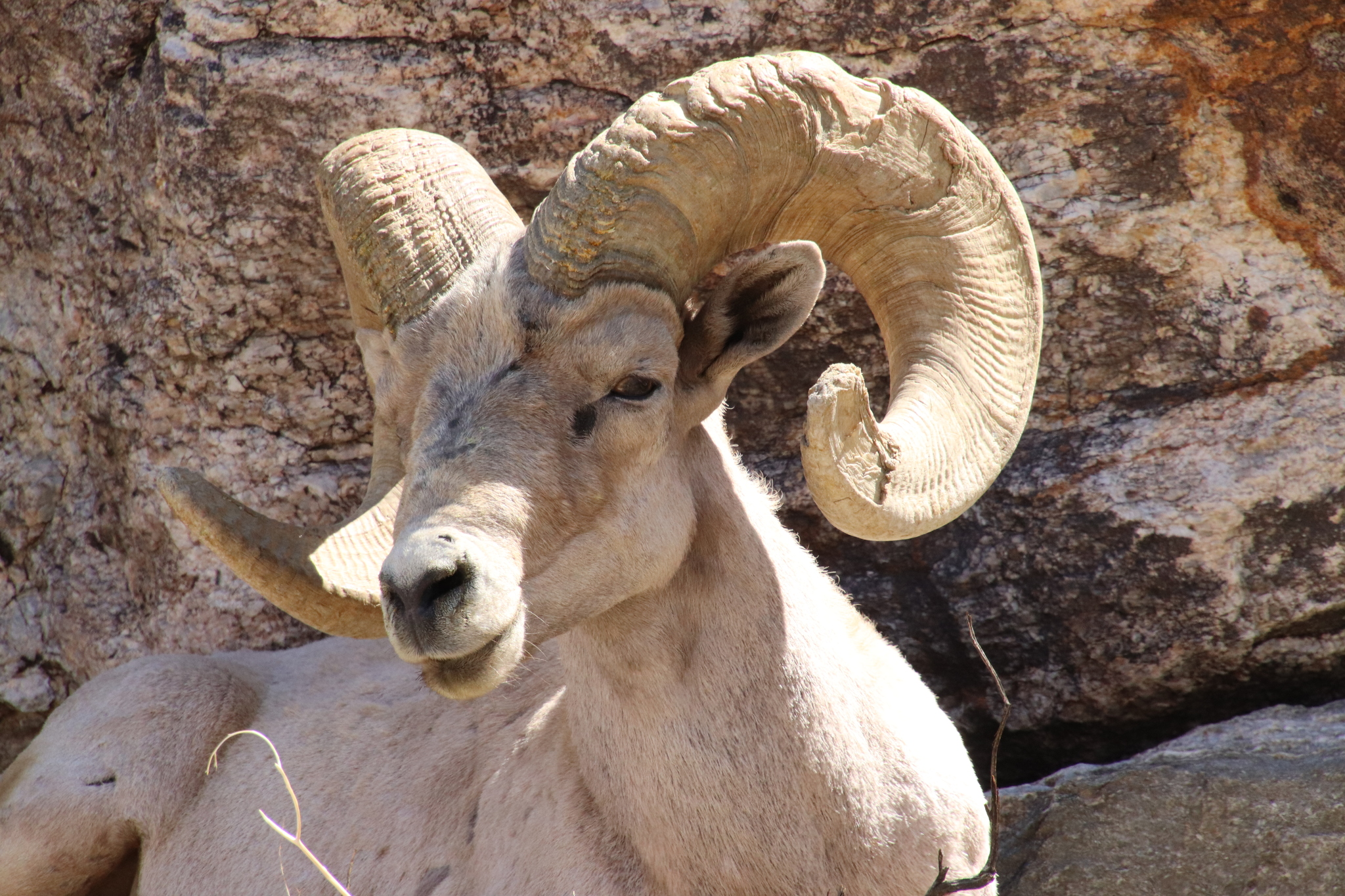
Large, spiral geometry of bighorn sheep horns

Given the extremely similar structure of horns to hooves, they share many similar properties. One such property is crack deflection and fracture toughness. Again, the layered lamellar hierarchy of keratin surrounding the tubules creates many interfaces for cracks to run into. One study found that the critical crack length for horn was 60%, meaning that a crack would have to extend through 60% of the transverse direction of a horn before it became critical, which shows extremely high toughness. Horn also has extremely high energy absorption and ability to withstand stress. This is attributed to the tubule orientation and keratin fiber density; unique to certain animals, the spiral geometry of the horn also allows for higher energy absorption. Specifically to bighorn sheep, studies found that their horns had a compressive stress of 4.0 MPa, a tensile stress of 1.4 MPa, and a fighting force of 3400N. The compressive stress is obviously much larger than the tensile stress, but like many other anisotropic materials, this is because an animal such as the bighorn sheep who uses their horns for fighting will be more likely to experience compressive stress and blunt impacts rather than tension. Finally, similar to hooves, horns are extremely tough but also lightweight, due to the lighter, less dense intratubular matrix.

==== Crustaceans ====
Aside from nacre and conch, crustacean exoskeleton and cortical bone are other biological structures that possess intricate features that may be beneficial for ballistic protection and low velocity blunt impact.

Structure

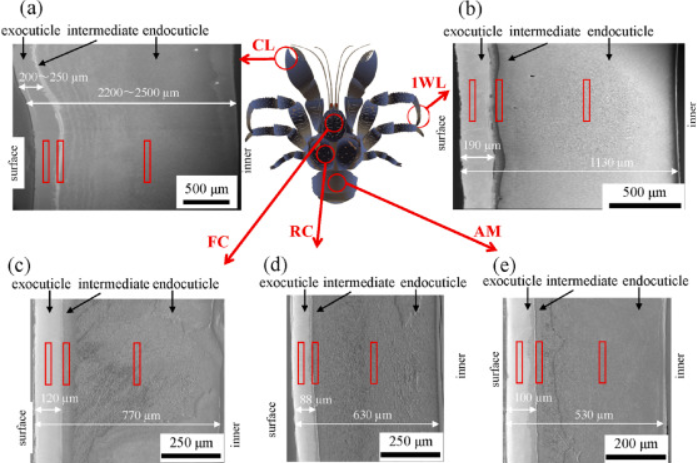
Variety of endocuticle and exocuticle thickness of crustacean exoskeleton depending on body part

The exoskeleton of crustaceans such as crab is made of chitin, which is an amino polysaccharide polymer. A polysaccharide polymer is derived from an amino sugar, a type of sugar where the hydroxyl group is replaced with an amine group. The chitin fibers are embedded in a calcite matrix. The crustacean exoskeleton, like many of the other models discussed previously, is hierarchical. It starts with the chitin polymer fibers arranged in a honeycomb pattern. These "honeycomb" planes are then stacked in a Bouligand pattern, consisting of several layered, rotating planes. This makes up the inner, endocuticle layer of the crustacean exoskeleton and accounts for 90% of the total exoskeleton. The outer exocuticle layer contains more densely packed chitin layers that end up being 200 μm thick. Thickness of the exocuticle and endocuticle layers vary in different parts of crustaceans.

Properties

One major mechanical property of the crustacean exoskeleton is high toughness and stiffness. This is attributed to the thick, densely layered exocuticle layer. Energy Dispersive X-Ray mapping found that the exocuticle layer has higher calcite mineralization in its matrix, increasing the "hardness" of the material. The endocuticle layer of the exoskeleton is responsible for energy absorption and crack deflection properties. This layer has a much lower stacking density of the chitin polymer layers than the exocuticle layer. This means that when placed under compressive forces, it is able to dissipate the load. Like mentioned in hoof and horn, the Bouligand pattern provides several interfaces for cracks to run into, creating high crack deflection. Overall, the combination of the hard, stiff exocuticle and the energy absorbing, compressible endocuticle create a structure that is extremely difficult to penetrate and serve as a good model for both blunt impact and ballistic shock applications.

==== Conch Shell ====
Structure

Conch is a type of shell composed of calcium carbonate composite material that has a three-order lamellar structure. The first order contains ceramic plates that are 5-60 μm thick. The second order consists of ceramic beams at two different 45º orientations, about 5-30 μm thick, and the third order is made up of thousands of tiny ceramic planks, 75-100 nm thick.

Properties

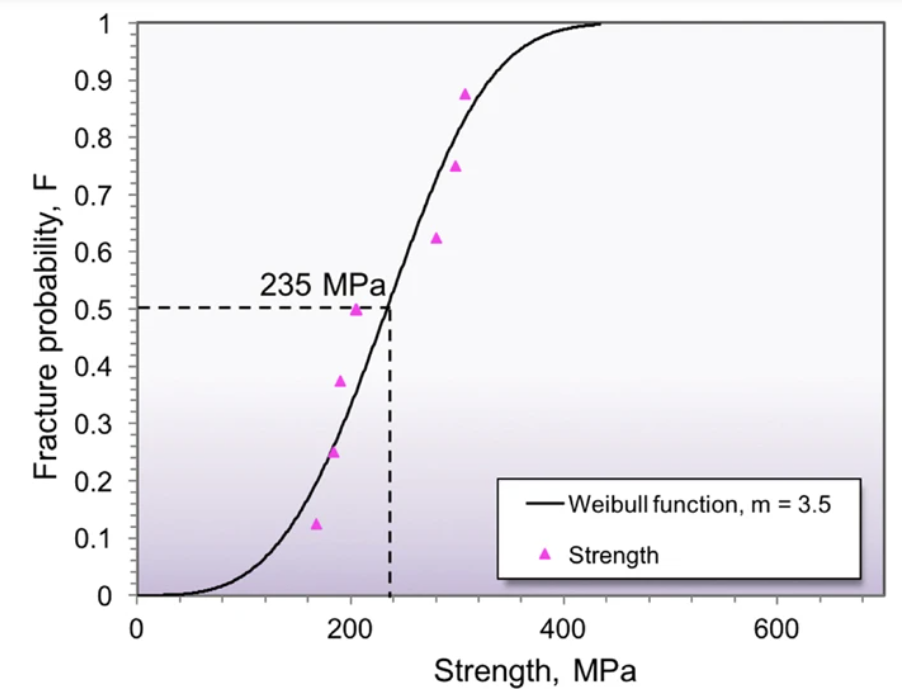
Weibull analysis for conch shell

The lamellar layers that make up the conch shell provide strong crack propagation. This structure also gives the conch shell several modes of fracture, which act as toughening mechanisms when put under different loads. Mode 1 fracture, which involves loading orthogonal to the plane of the crack, exists in the third order lamellae due to delamination of the layers. Mode 2 fracture, which involves loading parallel to the plane of the crack, also exist between third order lamella and cause a buckling effect. Compressive and bending tests showed that conch shell was highly anisotropic. It was found that conch is about 60MPa stronger in parallel loading compared to perpendicular loading. This was validated through a Weibull analysis for dynamic compression in surfaces both parallel and perpendicular to the load, the parallel loading was found to fail at higher fracture stresses.

=== Armor for Sharp Impact Loading ===
==== Crocodiles and Alligators ====
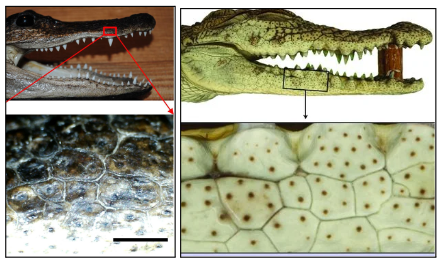
Image demonstrating Crocodile Cracking. Figure adapted from Figures 1A & 1B.

Crocodilian skin has the potential to be used as armor for sharp impact loading because its skin is embedded with bony particles (scutes) (i.e., osteoderms) . Dubbed "armored skin", osteoderms are composed of hydroxyapatite and collagen, the same components found in bone. The scutes have a bony network on their surface and are connected with the collagen fibrils. Osteoderms are present in reptiles (e.g., lizards, crocodilia, dinosaurs), fish, and some mammals (e.g., armadillos, mice), for protection from predators. The scutes on crocodiles have multiple functions, like thermoregulation, calcium storage, and toughening. The low weight and flexibility of the scutes are attributed to their porosity (~12%), while the matrix surrounding the pores gives them their hardness. Compression tests indicate that crocodilian scutes are strongest in the axial direction, with a strength of 67 MPa. The toughness of the scutes can be attributed to pore flattening, mineral bridge formation, and collagen bridge growth as energy dissipation mechanisms upon impact loading.

Crocodiles also have highly irregular polygons of keratinized skin on their head and faces, which offers additional protection. The cracks on the head and face of the crocodilian skin are generated from a cracking response, i.e., "crocodile cracking" that occurs when stress is applied. This cracking mechanism releases deformation energy and helps the skin maintain its hard exterior, with increased flexibility.

=== Armor for Mobility and Movement ===
In nature an efficient biological armor needs to be able to protect the organism while introducing the least amount of hindrance on its function. For many organisms' movement is one of their most important abilities, therefore, the armor cannot limit their movement mechanics.

Unlike the continuous structure used to protect stationary organisms, like clam shells, these types of armor are usually composed of many separate structures to allow for the elongation and contraction required for movement, while maintaining complete protection. There are two major classes of biological armor found in nature, these are scale armors and osteoderm armor. Both of these biological armors have specialized microstructures and macrostructures that produce the impressive properties of these materials.

==== Scales ====
Scale armor is the most widely expressed armor in nature. It is mostly seen on aquatic animals; however, it is also seen on some land animals such as pangolins. This armor is known for its impressive flexibility, while also its impressive compressive and puncture resistance. There are many subcategories of fish scales, but the main three are Elasmoid, Ganoid, and Placoid. These scale types are distinguished by their mechanical properties, geometric shape, and macroscopic alignments. Elasmoids are the typical oval shaped scales found on ray-finned fish. These scales are known for their ultra lightweight, puncture resistant, and flexibility which allows for the propulsion movements required for swimming. Ganoid scales are rhomboid in shape and exhibit enhanced stiffness, which is due to their thicker layer of mineralized material. Lastly, Placoid scales are best known by their shape. They have spines that run against the pattern of the scale which results in a sharp or rough feeling to the touch. These scales are found on animals like sharks and stingrays.

Structure

Elasmoid scale strength against force loading are significant due to their macrostructure. The macrostructure is composed of their positioning, shape, and scale features. Elasmoid scales are oval in shape, three quarters of which is covered by neighboring scales. This overlapping does not only allow for the movement of the organism while maintaining complete coverage, but also aids in the compressive force resistance. When the scales are loaded with a compressive force, it is distributed across all the neighboring scales. As these scales are bent into each other, in compressive loading or in natural movement, the scales exhibit a material hardening effect. This allows for each scale to be produced below the required stiffness to protect against an attack, however when joined in an overlapping pattern, the material is able to resist large compressive forces. This is one structure that this armor design uses to maintain light weight.

Another major macroscale system of the elasmoid scales are the physical scale features. The scales have grooves running from the focal point of the scale towards the edge, known as radii, as well as rings around the focal point in a concentric pattern, known as circuli. Both the radii and circuli are hypothesized to help in the bending mechanisms of the scale as well as aid in anchoring the scale into the dermis.

The macroscale structures of the scales are largely important for the armors function; however, the microstructures give the materials their impressive properties. These scales are made from composite materials. These are mineralized protein matrices that allow for the strength and toughness of the mineral while reducing the brittle effects of these materials with protein components. In the elasmoid scale there are three main layers. The Limiting layer, which is the outermost layer; the elasmodine outer, and the elasmodine inner layers which are defined by their level of mineralization.

The limiting layer is found just on the surface of the scale where it is the first line of defense against puncture. This layer varies its thickness depending where it is located on the scale as well as which species scale it is. It is typically on the 10-1000 micrometer scale in thickness. The limiting layer also forms various shapes depending on if it is posterior or anterior on the scale. Posterior limiting layer commonly forms varying pillar structures assumed to be for varying water interface functions, while the anterior portion is most commonly formed into the circuli shape discussed earlier. The cross-section of the anterior region shows a saw tooth shape. This is assumed to help with dermal integration.

This composite material is almost completely mineral apatite with small amounts of collagen. Between varying fish species researchers noted a carbonate substitution in the apatite structure. This material's structure is well developed for its application. This layer of the scales needs to be tough and stiff to help defend from punctures which explains the high level of mineral in this layer. The apatite percent volume in the limiting layer was around 65%.

Below the limiting layer there is a thicker basal plate composed of larger collagen fibrils, called the elasmodine layer. The elasmodine layer is split into the external elasmodine and internal elasmodine which are distinguished by the difference in their mineral content within the composite material. The external layer contains higher concentration of the mineral component while the internal layer contains almost only collagen. This variation between slightly mineralized to almost completely unmineralized composite leads to the great flexibility of the scales. As a force is applied to the surface of the scale, as seen in predatory attack, the outermost layer is put under compressive force and needs to resist puncture, while the innermost layer is experiencing tensile forces. The high mineral concentration of the limiting layer and the external elasmodine are better suited for dealing with compressive forces, while the almost completely unmineralized material of the inner elasmodine is better suited for stretching forces. The outer elamsodine layer is around 35% mineralized.

The collagen fibril alignment in the composite material plays a large role in the material properties. These collagen fibrils form a structure known as the Bouligand structure. The Bouligand structure is a rotated plywood design that imparts multidirectional strength. The collagen fibers in one layer are all aligned linearly in a single direction to give strengthening in that one direction. These unidirectional collagen fibril plies are then slightly offset from their neighboring layers to help with the materials overall multidirectional strength. The scale's strength and elastic modulus correlates to the number of elasmodine layers and the thickness of those layers compared to the overall scale thickness. Additionally, the collagen fibrils within each lamella layer do not demonstrate grouping. Each fibril is isolated and connected to its neighbors through sacrificial bonds. This connection allows for another level of force dissipation as the sacrificial bonds will break first under force instead of the macroscale material.

The structure of the scale armor is specifically designed to provide protection during movement, dissipate forces, and maintain lightweight. This is then combined with the microstructures of the scale to produce a material that is best suited for the required parameters. The composite material provides force resistance and puncture resistance, while still providing the flexibility required for the macrostructure movements. This combination of aspects provides great protective armor for many animals on earth.

An example of this armor structure in nature are the Arapaimas fish. These are large fish that exhibit these elasmoid scales and heavily rely on their microstructure and macrostructures to protect them. These fish live in the same water as piranhas, so having effective armor to protect themselves from possible piranha attacks are vital to their survival. The overlapping of the scales allows for the armor to absorb kinetic energy by transmitting the impact energy to adjacent discs. A larger number of scale layers can protect from larger forced attacks. For example, the Arapaima have an average of three scale layers which is capable of protecting from piranha attack. Without this efficiently designed armor these fish would not be protected in their habitats.

==== Osteoderms ====
Osteoderms are bony deposits formed inside the dermis, commonly found in lizard species and alligators. Osteoderms form inside the dermis with or without skeletal connection. The level of osteoderm distribution varies heavily between species. Some animals are completely covered, while others only have the armor in certain areas of the body.

Additionally, the size of the osteoderms varies highly depending on species and area of the body. There are typically larger plates on the back, side and belly, then smaller plates around the head and tail. There are also many types of osteoderm structures. They can form in isolated groups creating a partial coverage of the organism, but they can also form a structure more similar to the fish scales, where they overlap each other to form a more complete armor. Depending on the macroscale structure of armor the osteoderm morphology changes. The overlapping layers are typically thinner than standalone plates seen in the isolated groups.

Osteoderms are made of mineral composite materials. They include various types of bone, mineralized and unmineralized collagen bundles, as well as blood vessels. The composite material that makes up osteoderms are made from calcium phosphate and collagen. Due to the bone-like material structure, these materials are much more stiff than the fish scales previously discussed. With a complete coating of this armor, it would inhibit the mobility of the organism. However, these structures are connected by stiff fibers and dermal tissue which allow for the movement of the osteoderms. The soft regions, however, are not protected by the armor.

Osteoderm structures are formed similarly to bone; the outer layer is made of parallel fibered bone, with a cancellous core lined with lamellar bone. These bone structures have very similar mechanical properties to skeletal bone. By producing this dermal layer of bone, the organism creates a sacrificial layer of stiff bone at the surface of the skin to defend against point force attack. This structure is then surrounded by flexible dermal material to allow for movement, however as stated before, the gaps between the osteoderms are not protected leaving some vulnerable areas. This armor combines larger and more mechanically robust materials in a macrostructure design that still allows for movement.

== Implications ==
=== Military ===
Given their combined lightweight and protective nature, nacre, conch shell and fish scales are a few of the many organisms being studied by US military departments for bioinspired armor applications. The major complication that must be improved for these types of armor is enhancing flexibility and reducing weight of armor without compromising protection from ballistic type impacts.

The primary benefit from nacre-inspired biological armor is its extreme ability to resist penetration through energy dissipation. This is especially prevalent when compared to monolithic ceramic panels. Additionally, conch inspired materials provide improved tortuosity when compared to monolithic plates. Biological materials derived from these structures show promise for lightweight armor systems without compromising impact resistance. Materials inspired from fish scales have the potential to provide bending and rotation abilities to wearable armor systems as well.

Bone inspired bio-armor systems are also being explored for ballistic shock mitigation applications. One such system developed by the US Army Research Laboratory utilizes an alternating soft and stiff material distribution as found in the bones located in the forelimbs of horses. This particular bone system not only provides exceptional load bearing and impact resistance abilities, but has a design replicable for alternative armor applications. Using metallic foam materials, a "coupon" panel was designed to mimic the mechanical properties of the bone systems, and placed on a cylindrical steel support. The system was tested using gas gun testing, in which a high speed projectile was shot at the coupon. An Alulight aluminum foam (which is the same material consisting of the soft layers of the coupon) at different densities were used as a baseline for comparison. It was found that the bone and hoof inspired system was not only lighter, but had less projectile penetrations and shock absorption. The bone system had significantly reduced the accelerations of peak stress waves over both high and low frequencies, showing enhanced shock absorption.

=== Sports helmets and Equipment ===
Bioinspired armor also presents several applications in athletic equipment including helmets and other protective gear.

The alligator gar fish has scales resistant to cuts and punctures. Using 3D printing technology, various sized scales can be added to rubber pads providing these properties to regular clothing. This was tested on Kevlar gloves in particular, with smaller scales around finger joints and larger scales around the base of the hand. This was found to be useful in protecting against stab wounds or other sharp objects.

Polymer materials inspired by conch shells have also been explored, as they are difficult to break in drop tests, simulating the same impact as a bullet wound. A conch inspired design could also have the potential to make helmets thinner and lighter while offering the same level of protection. For example, a research group at MIT developed a 3D printed conch inspired prototype for use in helmets and body armor. This prototype was fabricated using proprietary Stralasys photopolymers Veromagenta and Tangoblackplus, which were deposited and cured under UV light. Using 3D printing and additive manufacturing techniques, the research group arranged the layers with 2 orders of hierarchy, and mimicked the alternating plank angles seen in conch. Drop tower testing was conducted where the composites were dropped at different heights, reaching up to 3 m/s. A composite with only a single order of hierarchy was used for comparison. The prototype with 2 orders of hierarchy was able to withstand damage at all incident velocities, while the control was damaged at a velocity of 2.5 m/s. This composite was found to enhance impact performance by 70% compared to the single order prototype, and 85% compared to a stiff material control. This study confirmed that hierarchical designs inspired from conch shell may have impressive applications in helmets due to their extraordinary ability to withstand blunt impacts.

Dragon silk is a type of spider silk that is thinner than human hair, yet stronger than Kevlar. Utilizing this material would create protective gear that is light, breathable, biodegradable and durable, with potential applications in bullet proof vests.

== Other Applications ==
=== Overview ===
In addition to creating armor for protection, bio-inspired armor also has medicinal implications. For instance, sponges, sealants, and powders can simulate blood coagulation and provide a barrier to an injury site. In particular, phenol-amine crosslinking found in insect exoskeletons has anti-cellular adhesion, antithrombotic, and antifouling properties. Combining the properties of the sponges and insect skeleton with the bioinspired materials mentioned above could lead to the creation of hybrid bioinspired armor with antimicrobial, antithrombotic properties and toughness.

=== Insect Sclerotization-Inspired Technologies ===
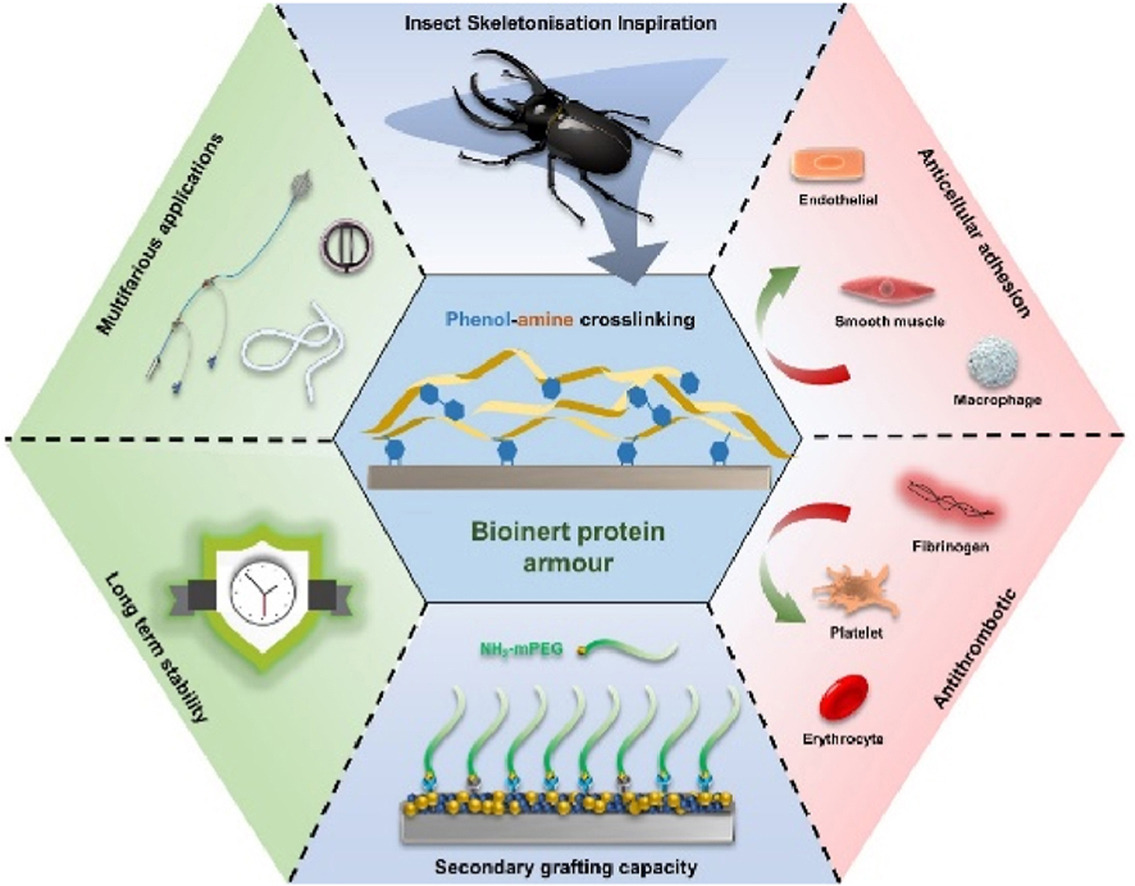
Properties of Insect-Sclerotization inspired technologies

The process of insect sclerotization involves the hardening of the exoskeleton shell which is facilitated by the covalent crosslinking of dopamine derivatives with chitin fibers and other endogenous proteins to generate the chitinous exoskeleton. One research group was able to create a crosslinked version of Bovine Serum Albumin (BSA) and Hydro caffeic acid (HCA) grafted with polyethylene glycol (PEG), by using the same mechanism found in insect sclerotization. The new cross-linked molecule had antifouling properties and prevented the formation of biofilms on biomedical devices, helping maintain sterility.

Using the same crosslinking method, catechol and collagen were crosslinked and chelated with zinc ions to create a "metal-phenol-polyamine system" on the surface of a sponge. The presence of the metal ions gave the sponge antimicrobial properties against gram-negative and gram-positive bacteria. The cross-linked substrates activated coagulation pathways to promote platelet aggregation, allowing the sponge armor to have hemostatic and would-healing properties. The efficacy of this technology was modeled in rabbit and rat studies, which demonstrated successful hemostasis and wound healing when these animals were treated with these sponges.

=== Medicinal Applications ===
Investigating the mechanisms behind the formation of biological armor can also provide insights into human disorders and diseases. In particular, the development of the osteoderms in alligator skin can be used to investigate the disease progression of heterotrophic ossification. Heterotrophic ossification, also known as "Stone Man" disease, is a human disease that results in bone formation in mature soft tissues. While the causes of heterotrophic ossification are known, the cellular mechanism has remained elusive. Alligator scutes have the potential to be a useful disease model for heterotrophic ossification because the osteoderms in alligators form in soft tissues at a late stage in development (post-embryonic stage), similar to the bone formations in heterotrophic ossification. Using the alligator osteoderms to study heterotrophic ossification's mechanism and disease progression can potentially lead to more effective treatment options for the disease (e.g., pharmaceutical).

Researchers at the Naval Medical Research Institute in Shanghai investigated the healing properties of shark skin on wounds exposed to seawater. Because wounds immersed in seawater are exposed to low temperatures, high salt concentrations, and various microbes they tend to have a slower healing process. Collagen (type I) extracted from Blue sharks and an anti-seawater immersion Polyurethane film was deposited on a sponge to create a shark skin collagen sponge bandage. The shark skin bandage shielded the wound from seawater for up to four hours after submersion and strongly promoted wound healing, compared to the gauze and chitosan bandages treated with Polyurethane film. Shark skin has also been investigated for applications in the transportation industry as a coating for airplanes to reduce drag.

== Manufacturing Processes ==
=== Additive Manufacturing ===
Additive manufacturing methods, including 3D printing/fused deposition modeling, material jetting, and powder based fusion have been used to manufacture bio-inspired armor.

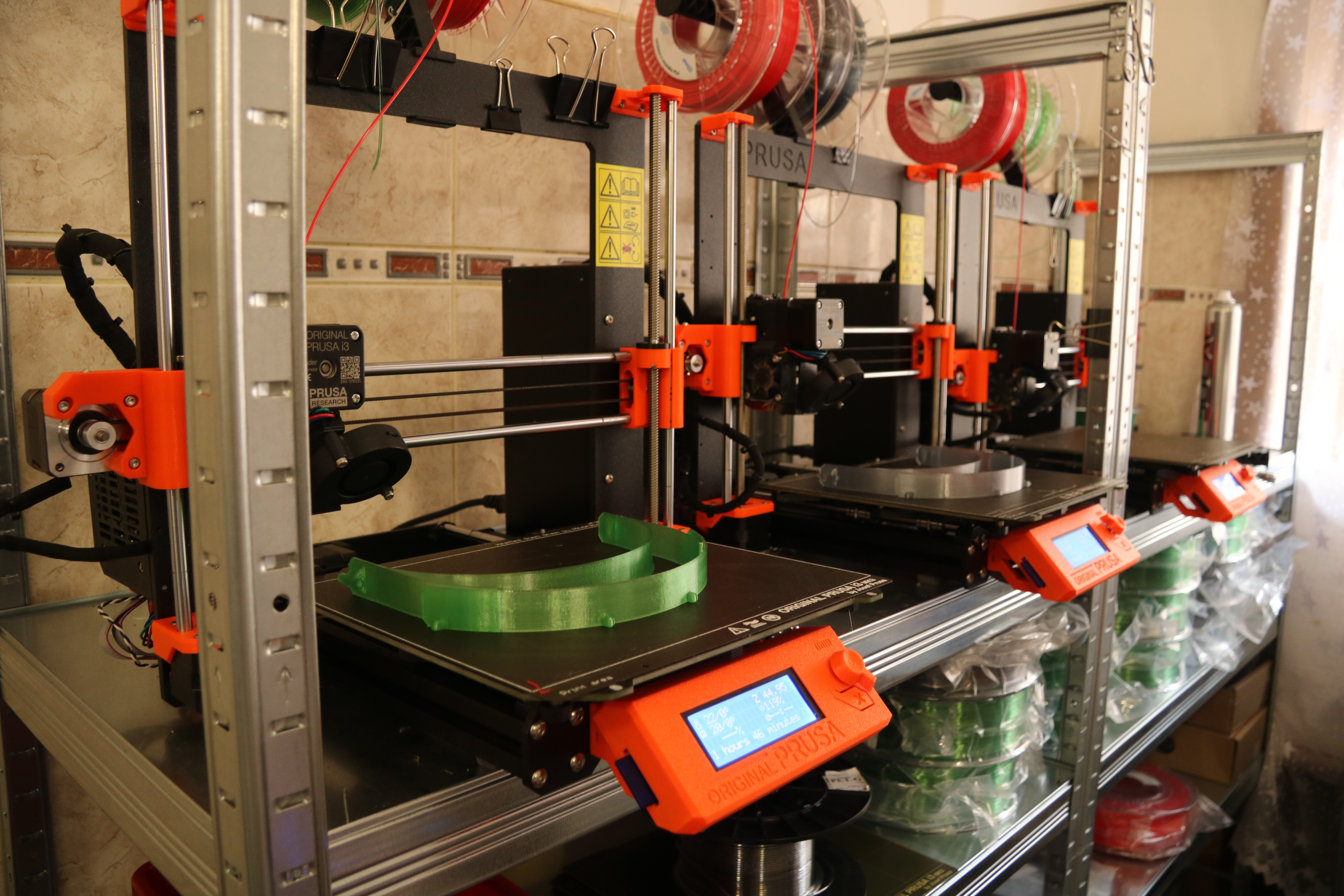
PRUSA 3D printers

3D printing and fused deposition modeling of biomimetic armor is popular due to its cost effectiveness and ease of manufacturing. The filament-based 3D printing process involves extruding a polymer filament through a nozzle and printing objects layer-by-layer onto a hot surface. Common filaments used in this process are ABS, PLA, TPU, and PE. Once finished, the part requires no additional treatment. Powder-based 3D printing involves spreading a thin layer of powder onto a surface and connecting it with a binder into the desired geometry. Undesired powder is removed once the object is printed. Some common powders used are Sr-HT, aluminum oxide powder, and calcium polyphosphate. Compared to filament-based 3D printing, powder-based manufacturing provides higher manufacturing accuracy and finer detail on the micro scale. Overall, challenges with 3D printing include recreating the precise details on the nanoscale, poor surface quality, and slow printing rate.

3D printing and FDM have been used to create armors mimicking the structure of nacre, conch, and fish scale. In biomimetic nacre-like armors created through FDM show improved impact resistance compared to a monolithic panel, as well as minimized damage. For overlapping scales based on fish, 3D printing allowed flexibility while maintaining a multiple layer defense. Stiff and soft layered extruded armor based on horse hooves also allowed for greater energy absorption relative to a monolayer.

Material jetting (MJ), also referred to as 3D inkjet printing, is the process by which a photopolymer resin is deposited onto a surface as droplets, then cured by UV light. MJ features high resolution, desirable surface properties, and multi-material prints. MJ has been used to create composite stiff/soft biomimetic materials, as well as common structural motifs like Bouligand, helicoidal, overlapping, and lamellar. MJ is therefore useful for printing conch shell inspired (cross-lamellar), fish scale inspired, and chitinous inspired armors. Despite these benefits, MJ is expensive, requires post-processing, and uses sensitive materials that may degrade the final quality of the part.

=== Subtractive Manufacturing ===
Subtractive manufacturing methods have been used in the production of biomimetic armor, although they are not as common as additive manufacturing methods in this field. Biomimetic armor often takes inspiration from natural structures and organisms to create materials with enhanced properties such as strength, flexibility, and lightweight characteristics. Some subtractive manufacturing methods that have been employed in the fabrication of biomimetic armor include CNC machining, and laser cutting/engraving.

Computer Numerical Control (CNC) machining involves the use of computer-controlled machinery to remove material from a workpiece. It allows for precise shaping and detailing of various materials, including metals, ceramics, and composites, which can be utilized in biomimetic armor production. CNC machining has been used to create nacre-like dovetail tablets using PMMA.

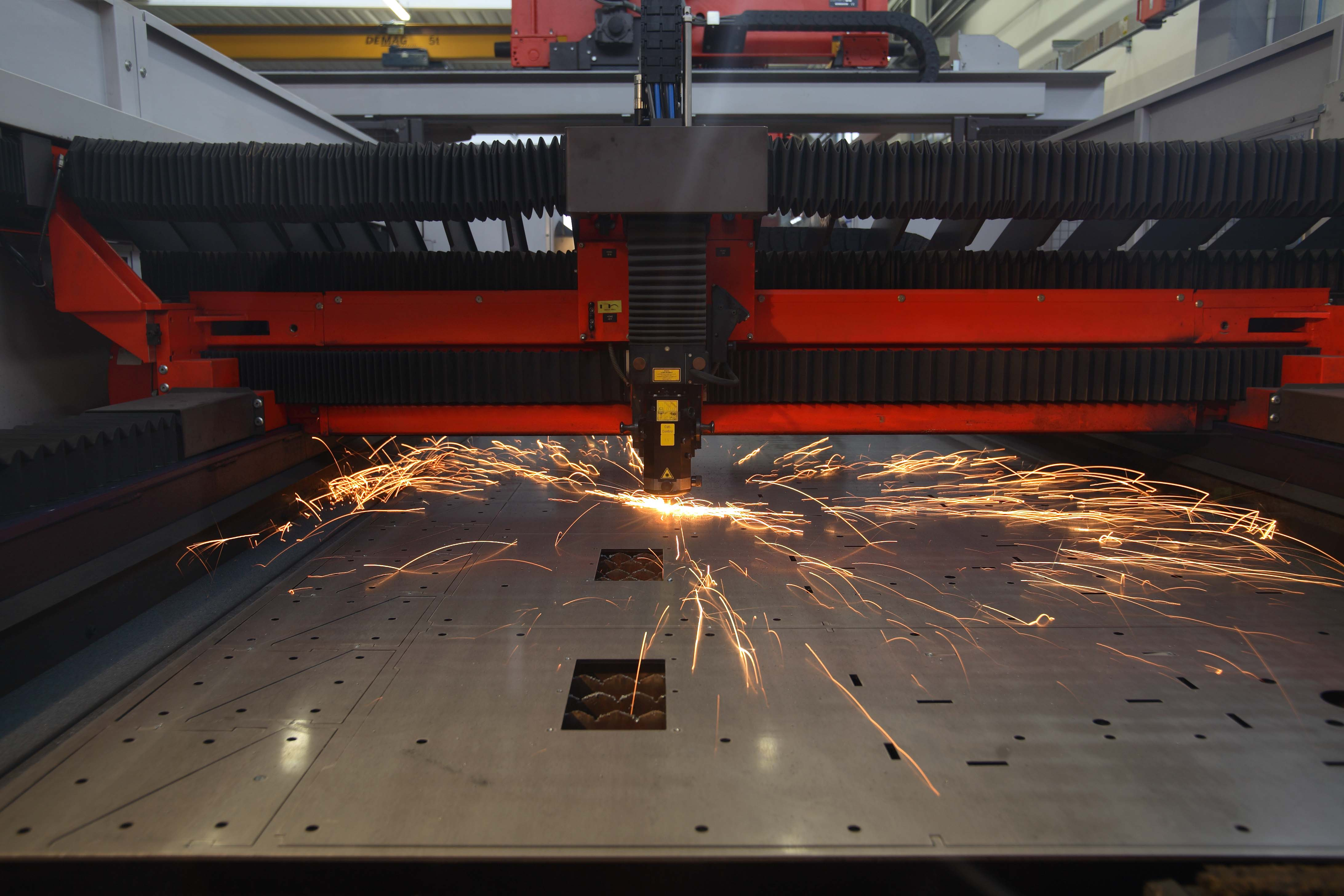
Laser cutter

Laser cutting/engraving involves the use of a high-powered laser beam to cut through materials. It offers high precision and can be used with a variety of materials, including metals, polymers, and composites. Laser cutting can be employed in the fabrication of biomimetic armor to create intricate designs and patterns, and has notably been used to engrave the dovetail patterns of nacre tablets onto carbon-fiber/epoxy composites. Additionally, laser engraving has been used to manufacture a segmented plate inspired by fish scales that was then placed on a soft elastomeric substrate.

These subtractive manufacturing methods can be combined with other techniques and processes to create biomimetic armor that mimics the structural and functional characteristics of natural organisms, providing enhanced protection and performance in various applications.
