= Kraig =

Name list Kraig and Urena Cherry

Kraig is a male given name as well as a family name. Notable people with the name include:

As a given name:

- Kraig Chiles, American soccer player
- Kraig Grady, musician
- Kraig Kann, anchor on The Golf Channel
- Kraig Kinser, American race car driver
- Kraig Metzinger, American actor
- Kraig Nienhuis, hockey player
- Kraig Paulsen, politician from Iowa
- Kraig Urbik, American football player

As a surname:

- Donald Michael Kraig, American occult author

== History and origin ==
Kraig is a variant of Craig. In the Scottish origin, the meaning of Kraig is derived from the Scottish Gaelic craeg, meaning "rock".

In numerology, people with this name are known to be determined and independent. First borns are known to be leaders and headed for success, while their charismatic personality means they have no trouble making new friends.

== See also ==
- Kraig Biocraft Laboratories, a biotechnology company
- Craig (disambiguation)
