= Dragon silk =

Material created from genetically modified silkworms to create body armor

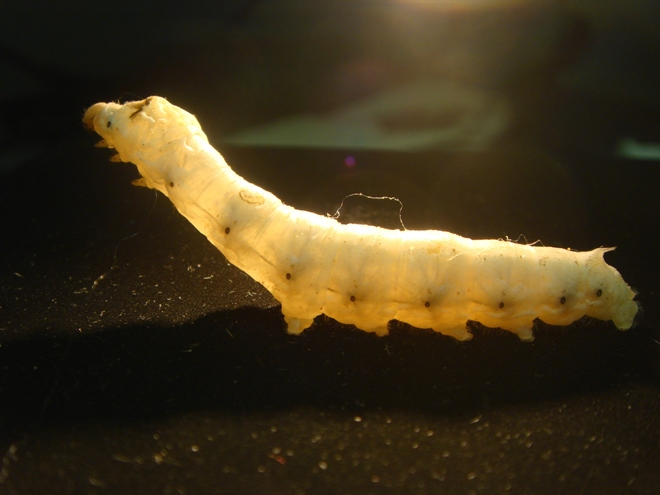
Mature Silkworm before Spinning

Dragon silk is a material created by Kraig Biocraft Laboratories of Ann Arbor, Michigan from genetically modified silkworms to create body armor. Dragon silk combines the elasticity and strength of spider silk. It has the tensile strength as high as 1.79 gigapascals (as much as 37%) and the elasticity above 38% exceeding the maximum reported features of the spider silk. It is reported that dragon silk is more flexible than the "Monster Silk" and stronger than the "Big Red, recombinant spider silk designed for increased strength.

== Mechanical properties ==
Dragon silk has properties higher than that of any other fiber ever noticed.

=== Tensile Strength ===
Tensile strength of dragon silk is higher than that of steel (450-2000 MPa). The reported strength of dragon silk is as high as 1.79 GPa, which is 37% higher than the widely reported spider silk. Its tensile strength is higher than the "Big Red silk," which had been reported as the strongest fiber ever made. "Big Red Silk" was developed in the same laboratories as dragon silk.

=== Flexibility ===
Dragon silk is far more flexible than Kevlar (a common material in ballistic body armor). Its flexibility is 38% higher than normal spider silk and is noticeably more flexible than the "Monster silk" from the same laboratory. In percentage, Kevlar's flexibility is 3% and dragon silk's flexibility is 30% to 40%.

== History ==
Spider silk is known as one of the strongest natural fibers. However, because spiders are cannibalistic and territorial, it is difficult to create a cost-effective spider farm. To overcome this problem, eight scientists, three from Kraig Labs, developed a method for making spider-like silk from silkworms. In 2011, Malcolm J. Fraser, Donald L. Jarvis and their colleagues published a study in which they described how they engineered transgenic silkworms to do so. In this study, the scientists adjusted the silkworms' silk-making protein using piggyBac vectors and combined it with the spiders' protein to build unique forms of silkworms, which they call "super silkworms", that can spin composite spider/silkworm silk.

Kraig Biocraft was contracted with the US Army in 2017–2018 to assemble ballistic shoot packs from Dragon Silk to evaluate its potential for applications in protective apparel.

Since the production of Dragon Silk, Kraig Biocraft Laboratories has gone on to create other forms of spider silk from silkworms, some with a purity rate almost ten times greater than Dragon Silk.
