= François Xavier Bon de Saint Hilaire =

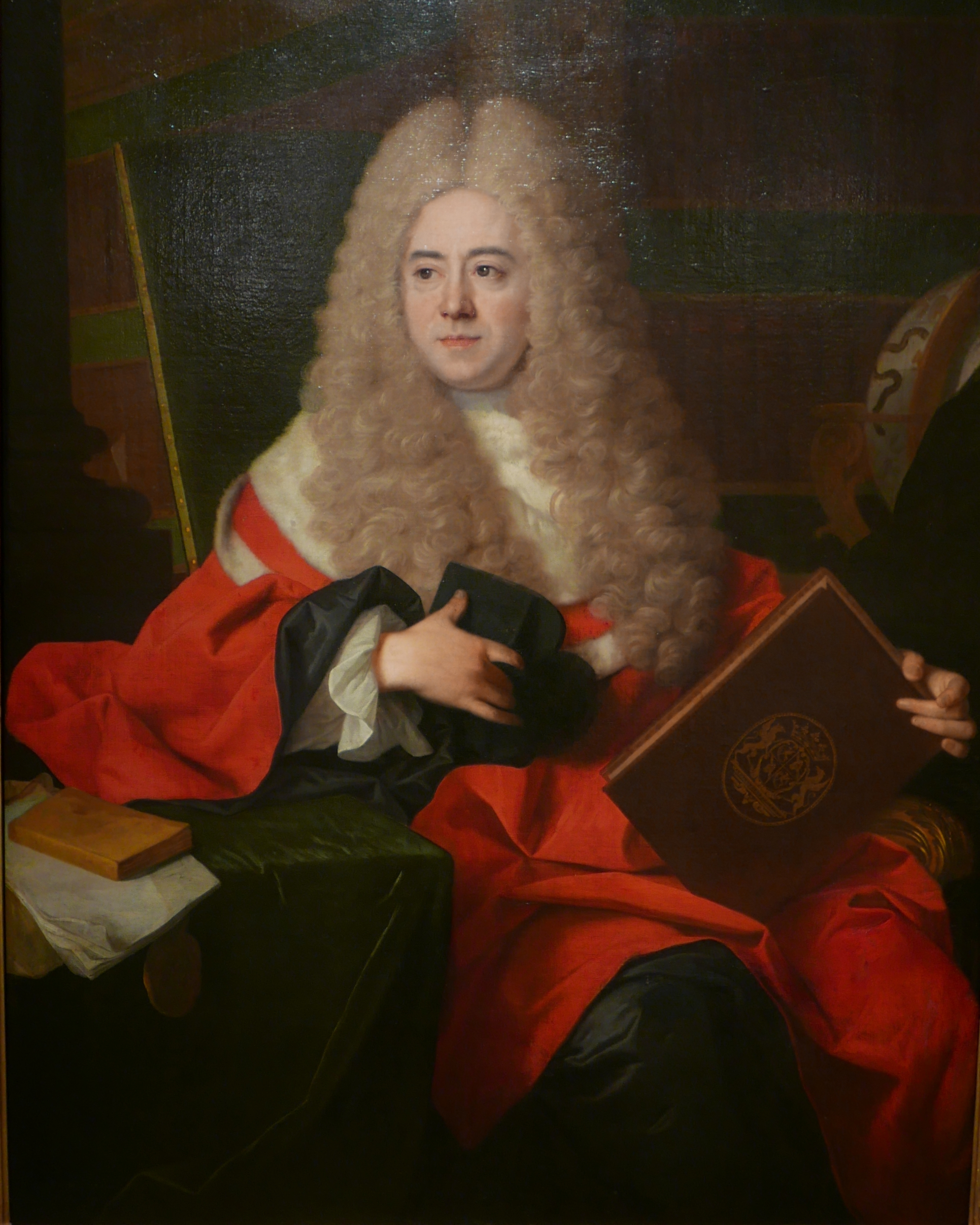
François Xavier Bon de Saint-Hilaire c.1713 by Jean Ranc

François Xavier Bon de Saint Hilaire (1678–1761), president of the Court of Auditors of Montpellier, Languedoc, demonstrated in 1709 that he could make fabric from spider silk. Many egg cocoons were boiled, washed and dried and the thread was collected with fine combs. By this method, he produced three pairs of spider silk stockings and gloves. He presented one pair to Hans Sloane at the Royal Society in London and the remaining two to the Académie Royale des Sciences in Paris. He also claimed to have manufactured medicines from spiders which could cure apoplexy, lethargy, and coma. His report, published in 1710, was republished several times and was translated into several languages including Chinese. Bon de Saint Hilaire also made one of the first ventures into the mass-cultivation of spider silk, keeping the creatures in crates of fifty and one-hundred, only to find, upon returning after a considerable duration, that the spiders had thinned themselves out to a mere few remaining members.

He was named to the Académie des Inscriptions et Belles-Lettres in 1750.
