= Kraig Biocraft Laboratories =

American biotechnology company

- Type: Public
- Industry: Biotechnology
- Founded: 2006; 20 years ago
- Founder: Kim Thompson
- Headquarters: Ann Arbor, Michigan
- Key people: Kim Thompson; (Founder and CEO); Jon Rice; (COO)
- Website: www.kraiglabs.com

Kraig Biocraft Laboratories, Inc. is an American biotechnology company headquartered in Ann Arbor, Michigan. It develops and manufactures recombinant spider silks and other high-performance polymers using spider silk gene sequences. Their most notable fiber is dragon silk which has been demonstrated to be tougher than many fibers used in bullet proof vests.

== History ==
Kim Kraig Thompson, a retired lawyer, invented the protein expression platform in 2002, which would become the basis for Kraig Lab's work with spider silk. He founded Kraig Biocraft Laboratories in April 2006 to develop and commercialize spider silks and other high-performance polymers gene and sequences using platform technology in combination with genetic engineering concepts.

The original scientific work to reduce Thompson's invention to practice was performed in the biological laboratories of the University of Notre Dame. The University of Notre Dame was chosen in large part because the co-inventor of the PiggyBac transposon system, Malcom Fraser, was in residence there. This transposon was utilized by Kraig Labs and the University of Notre Dame to create the world's first transgenic silkworm producing recombinant spider silk. This work was subsequently the subject of a peer-reviewed article in the publication of the National Academy of Sciences (PNAS).

In 2011, Sigma-Aldrich started developing genetically modified silkworms in partnership with Kraig Biocraft Laboratories in order to produce spider silk.

In 2019, the company's wholly owned subsidiary, Prodigy Textiles LLC, established production facility in Vietnam for the production of spider silk.

== Research ==
The company's production platform is based upon genetic modification of the domesticated silk worm, Bombyx mori.

In 2020, the firm successfully developed a significantly more advanced technology platform. This utilized a non-CRISPR gene editing, large plasmid knock-in knock-out technology. The new platform allows for the creation of essentially pure spider silk. Other than the silkworm's remaining specifically desired native silk protein elements, Kraig Labs is now able to produce nearly pure spider silk. The knock-in knock-out technology allows Kraig Labs to work with very complex protein sequences in the silkworms, which are about four times more complex than published technologies. The company's Generation III Spider Silk Technology is purposed for specific customization.

Kraig Labs originally used the PiggyBac Transposon plasmid vector that was developed in collaboration with the University of Notre Dame. In all methods, specific sequences of spider DNA are inserted into the genetic makeup of the silkworm to create a silkworm that produces spider silk. That transgenic silkworm is then used as the basis for establishing a genetic line silkworms that also produce spider silk. The firm is able to customize the sequences that it inserts into the silkworm, thus giving them the ability to customize the resulting silk thread's strength, flexibility and possibly other properties.
