= Bouligand structure =

Microstructure of natural materials

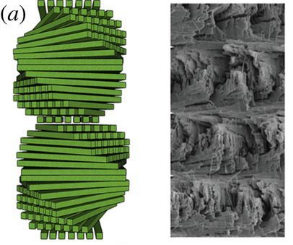
Bouligand structure model and SEM image of structure as found in dactyl club of the mantis shrimp.

A Bouligand structure is a layered and rotated microstructure resembling plywood, which is frequently found in naturally evolved materials. It consists of multiple lamellae, or layers, each one composed of aligned fibers. Adjacent lamellae are progressively rotated with respect to their neighbors. This structure enhances the mechanical properties of materials, especially its fracture resistance, and enables strength and in plane isotropy. It is found in various natural structures, including the cosmoid scale of the coelacanth, and the dactyl club of the mantis shrimp and many other stomatopods. In physics, these structures were conceived in 1869 by Ernest Reusch and are called Reusch piles.

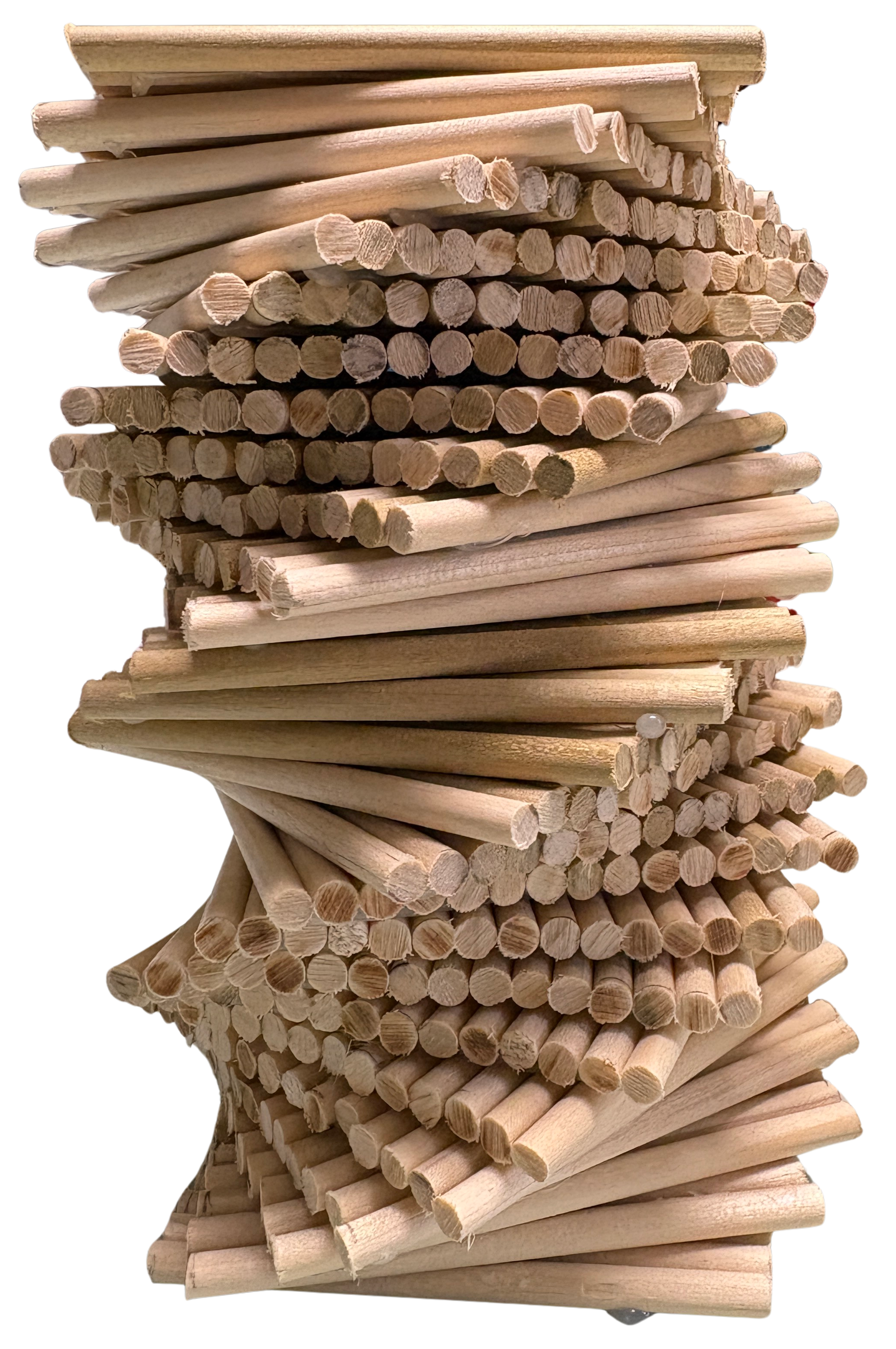
A wooden model of a Bouligand structure. Each lamella is placed at a ~6.5° offset from adjacent lamellae.

Due to its desirable mechanical properties, there are ongoing attempts to replicate Bouligand arrangements in the creation of failure resistant bioinspired materials. For example, it has been shown that layered composites (such as CFRP) utilizing this structure have enhanced impact properties. However, replicating the structure on small length scales is challenging, and the development and advancement of manufacturing techniques continually improves the ability to replicate this desirable structure.

== Mechanical Properties ==
=== Toughening Mechanisms ===
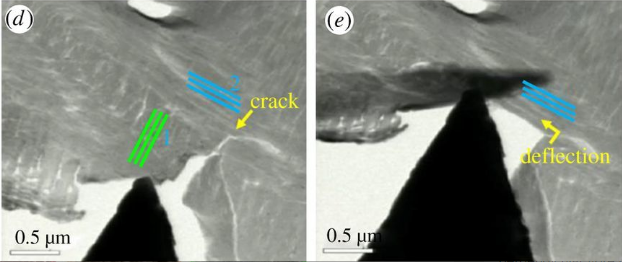
Picoindentation of Bouligand Structure in Dactyl Club

The Bouligand structure found in many natural materials is credited with imparting a very high toughness and fracture resistance to the overall material it is a part of. The mechanisms by which this toughening occurs are many, and no one mechanism has yet to be identified as the main source of the structure's toughness. Both computational work and physical experiments have been done to determine these pathways by which the structure resists fracture so that synthetic tough Bouligand structures can be taken advantage of.

Crack deflection of one form or another is considered the main toughening mechanism in the bouligand structure. Deflection can take the form of crack tilting, and crack bridging. In the former, the crack propagates along the direction of the fiber plane; at the interface with the matrix material. Once the energy release rate at the tip is sufficiently low, the crack can no longer propagate along the fiber direction and must switch to crack bridging. This mode involves the crack changing direction drastically and cutting through fibers to reach a new plane to propagate along. A combination of crack tilting and crack bridging in the bouligand structure results in a highly distorted and enlarged crack. This causes the new surface area created by the propagating crack to increase dramatically relative to a straight crack; making further propagation less and less favorable and in turn toughening the material.

In addition to crack deflection which simply causes a single crack to change direction and follow a more tortuous path, the bouligand structure can also tolerate multiple cracks to form and keep them from coalescing. This is sometimes termed crack twisting.

Inherently accompanying crack deflection, tilting, bridging and twisting is the mixing of fracture modes. Fracture modes include opening, in-plane shear, and out-of-plane shear. The mixing of these modes via crack bridging, tilting and twisting all greatly complicate the stress fields experienced by the material; helping to dissipate the force on any one laminate plane.

==== Impact Resistance ====
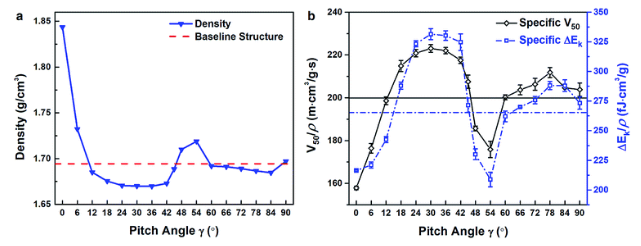
Density, Specific Ballistic Limit Velocity, and Specific Energy Absorption as a Function of Pitch in Bouligand Structured Nanocellulose Film

Impact resistance in materials is differentiated from toughening in general by the rate at which stress is applied. In impact testing, the rate at which either stress or strain is applied to the sample is much higher than so-called static testing. In synthetic nano-cellulose films formed into bouligand structures, it was shown that as the pitch angle was increased, the density quickly drops to a roughly constant value as the films are not able to neatly stack onto each other. This value rises again between 42 and 60 degrees and re-stabilizes at higher angles. This reduction in density is accompanied by a sharp increase in both specific ballistic limit velocity, and specific energy absorption. The relatively small angles of 18 to 42 degrees that correlate to the lowest density for the bouligand structure also are shown to have better impact resistance, and better energy adsorption than traditional synthetic quasi-isotropic structures made for impact resistance. This experimentally optimized range of angles for impact resistance is consistent with the range of angles between fiber layers found in natural examples of the bouligand structure.

Another means of toughening the bouligand structure is by shear wave filtering. The periodic and hierarchical nature of the Bouligand structure, creates a shear wave filtering effect that is especially effective during high intensity dynamic loads. As the force is applied, specific frequencies that are in shear are not permitted to transmit through the layered structure, creating a band gap in the transmitted energies and decreasing the effective energy felt by the system. The pitch angle of the layers, thickness of the layers, and number of layers present in the material all effect which frequencies are filtered out.

==== Adaptability ====
Adjustment of the Bouligand structure during loading has been measured using small angle X-ray scattering (SAXS). The two adjustment effects are the change in angle between the collagen fibrils and tensile axis, and the stretching of collagen fibrils. There are four mechanisms through which these adjustments occur.

1. Fibrils rotate because of interfibrillar shear: As a tensile force is applied, fibrils rotate to align with the tensile direction. During deformation, the shear component of the applied stress causes the hydrogen bonds between fibrils to break and then reform after fibril adjustment.
2. Collagen fibrils stretch: Collagen fibrils can elastically stretch, resulting in fibrils re-orientating to align with the tensile direction.
3. Tensile opening of interfibrillar gaps: Fibrils highly misoriented with the tensile direction can separate, creating an opening.
4. "Sympathetic" lamella rotation: A lamella is able to rotate away from the tensile direction if it is sandwiched between two lamellae that are reorienting themselves towards the tensile direction. This can happen if the bonding between these lamellae is high.

Ψ refers to the angle between the tensile axis and the collagen fibril. Mechanisms 1 and 2 both decrease Ψ. Mechanisms 3 and 4 can increase Ψ, as in, the fibril moves away from the tensile axis. Fibrils with a small Ψ stretch elastically. Fibrils with a large Ψ are compressed, since adjacent lamellae contract in accordance with Poisson's ratio, which is a function of strain anisotropy.

=== Single vs. Double Bouligand Structure ===
The most common Bouligand structure found in nature is the twisted plywood structure where there is a constant angle of misalignment between layers. A rare variation of this structure is the so-called "double twisted" Bouligand structure seen in Coelacanth. This structure uses stacks of two as units to be twisted with respect to each other at some constant misalignment angle. The two fibril layers in each of these units in this case lay such that their fibril orientation is perpendicular to each other.

The mechanical differences between the single and double twisted bouligand structure has been observed. It was shown that the double bouligand structure is stiffer and tougher than the more common single bouligand structure. The increase in stiffness is also accompanied by a reduction of flexibility. The increased strength is attributed in part to an addition to the structure of "inter-bundle fibrils" that run up and down the stack of layers, perpendicular to the twisted fiber planes. These fiber bundles help keep the structure together by greatly increasing the energy needed for inter-fibril sliding. These bundles are coupled with the double twisted nature of the plywood arraignment, which shifts the direction a crack would like to grow drastically with each layer.

It has also been observed that a structure can form mostly similar to the single twisted bouligand structure, but with a non-constant angle of misalignment. It is still unclear how this particular structural difference affects mechanical properties.

== Examples in Nature ==
=== Arthropods ===
The arthropod exoskeleton is highly hierarchical. Polysaccharide chitin fibrils arrange with proteins to form fibers, the fibers coalesce into bundles, and then the bundles arrange into horizontal planes which are stacked helicoidally, forming the twisted plywood Bouligand structure. Repeating Bouligand structures form the exocuticle and endocuticle. Differences in the Bouligand structure of the exocuticle and endocuticle have been found to be critical for analyzing the mechanical properties of both regions.

Arthropods have exoskeletons that provide protection from the environment, mechanical load support, and body structure. The outer layer, called the epicuticle, is thin and waxy and is the main waterproofing barrier. Below is the procuticle, which is designed as the main structural element to the body. The procuticle is made of two sections, the exocuticle on the outer part, and the endocuticle on the inner part. The exocuticle is denser than the endocuticle; the endocuticle makes up about 90 volume % of the exoskeleton. Both the exocuticle and endocuticle are made with a Bouligand structure.

==== Crabs ====
In crab exoskeletons, calcite and amorphous calcium carbonate are the minerals deposited in the chitin-protein hierarchical matrix. The sheep crab (Loxorhynchun grandis), like other crabs, has a highly anisotropic exoskeleton. The spacing between the (x-y) plane Bouligand lamellae in the crab exocuticle is ~3-5μm, whereas the interlamellar spacing in the endocuticle is much greater, about 10-15μm. The smaller spacing of the exocuticle results in a higher lamellae density in the exocuticle. There is a higher hardness measurement in the exocuticle than the endocuticle, which is attributed to a higher mineral content in the exocuticle. This gives a higher wear resistance and hardness on the surface of the exoskeleton, thus giving the crab a greater degree of protection. Under stress, the Bouligand planes fail via normal bundle fracture or bundle separation mechanisms. The exocuticle-endocuticle interface is the most critical region and typically where failure first occurs, due to the anisotropic structure and discontinuity of Bouligand planes and spacing at this interface.

In the z-direction, porous tubules exist normal to the Bouligand planes that penetrate the exoskeleton. The function of these tubules is to transport ions and nutrients to the new exoskeleton during the molting process. The presence of these tubules, which have a helical structure, results in a ductile necking region during tension. An increased degree of ductility increases the toughness of the crab exoskeleton.

==== Lobster ====
The Homarus americanus (American lobster) is an arthropod with an exoskeleton structure similar to the crabs above, and with similar trends comparing the endo- and exo- cuticles. An important note for the lobster exoskeleton structural/mechanical properties is the impact of the honeycomb structure formed by the Bouligand planes. The stiffness values for the exocuticle in lobster range from 8.5-9.5 GPa, while the endocuticle ranges from 3–4.5 GPa. Gradients in the honeycomb network, especially at the interface between the endo- and exo- cuticle are believed to be the reason for this discrepancy between the structures.

==== Mantis Shrimp ====
Stomatopods have thoracic appendages that are used to hunt prey. The appendages can either be spear-like or club-like, depending on the species. Mantis shrimp with a club-like appendage, or "dactyl club", uses it to smash the shell of prey such as mollusks or crabs. The peacock mantis shrimp is a species of mantis shrimp that has a dactyl club. The clubs are able to withstand fracture under the high stress waves associated with blows against prey. This is possible due to the multi-regional structure of the clubs, which includes a region incorporating a Bouligand structure.

The outer, top region of the club is called the impact region. The impact region is supported periodic zones and a striated region. The periodic regions are below the impact region, on the inside of the club. The striated region is present on the sides of the club, surrounding the edges of the periodic region.

The impact region is about 50 to 70 μm thick, and is made with highly crystallized hydroxyapatite. The periodic region is dominated by an amorphous calcium carbonate phase. Surrounded by the amorphous mineral phase are chitin fibrils, which make up a Bouligand structure. The layered arrangement of the periodic region corresponds to a compete 180° rotation of the fibers. The impact region has a similar structure, but with a larger pitch distance (length between compete 180° rotation). The striated region is made of highly aligned parallel chitin fiber bundles.

The club appendage can sustain high intensity load by shear wave filtering because of the periodicity and chirality of its Bouligand structure. Catastrophic crack growth is hindered in two ways. When crack growth follows the helicoidal structure between layers of chitin fibers, a large surface area per crack length is produced. Therefore, there is high total energy dissipated during club impact and crack propagation. When cracks propagate through neighboring layers, growth is hampered because of modulus oscillation. The Bouligand structure has anisotropic stiffness, resulting in an elastic modulus oscillation through the layers. Overall damage tolerance is improved, with crack propagation depending on growth direction in relation to chitin fiber orientation.

=== Fish ===
==== Arapaima ====
The Arapaima fish's outer scales are designed to resist piranha bites. This is achieved through the scales' hierarchical architecture. The thinness of the scales and their overlapping arrangement allow for flexibility during movement. This also influences how much a single scale will bend when a predator attacks.

In the species Arapaima gigas, each scale has two distinct structural regions which results in a scale that is resistant to puncture and bending. The outer layer is about 0.5 mm thick and is highly mineralized, which makes it hard, promoting predator tooth fracture. The inner layer is about 1 mm thick and is made of mineralized collagen fibrils arranged in a Bouligand structure. In the fibrils, collagen molecules are embedded with hydroxyapatite mineral nanocrystals. Collagen fibrils align in the same direction to make a layer of collagen lamella, of about 50 μm in thickness. Lamellae are stacked with a misalignment in orientation, creating a Bouligand structure.

When the scales bend during an attack, stress is distributed due to the corrugated morphology. The largest deformation is designed to occur in the inner core layer. The inner layer can support more plastic deformation than the brittle outer layer. This is because the Bouligand structure can adjust its lamellar layers to adapt to applied forces.

Adjustment of the Bouligand structure during loading has been measured using small angle X-ray scattering (SAXS). The four mechanisms through which adjustments occur are fibril rotation, collagen fibril stretching, tensile opening between fibrils, and sympathetic lamella rotation.

Fibrils adapting to the loading environment enhance the flexibility of the lamellae. This contributes resistance to scale bending, and therefore increases fracture resistance. As a whole, the outer scale layer is hard and brittle, while the inner layer is ductile and tough.

==== Carp ====
A similar Bouligand structure was found in the scales of the common carp (Cyprinus carpio). Compared to the arapaima, the mineral content in carp scales is lower, while exhibiting higher total energy dissipation in tensile testing as well as higher fibril extensibility.

== Biomimicry ==
=== Additive Manufacturing ===
Additive manufacturing is a popular upcoming form of industry which allows for complex geometries and unique performance characteristics for AM parts. The main issue with mechanical properties of AM parts is the introduction of microstructural heterogeneities within layers of deposited material. These defects, including porosity and unique interfaces, result in anisotropy of the mechanical response of the workpiece, which is undesirable. To combat this anisotropic mechanical response, a Bouligand-inspired tool path is used to deposit the material in a twisted Bouligand structure. This results in a stress transfer mechanism which uses interlayer heterogeneities as stress deflection points, thus strengthening the workpiece at these points. Bouligand tool paths are used specifically in cement/ceramic deposition AM. Bouligand-inspired AM parts have been observed to behave better than cast elements under mechanical stress.

==== Pitch Angle ====
A critical parameter in the development of the Bouligand-inspired tool path is the pitch angle. The pitch angle γ is the angle at which the helicoidal structure is formed. The relative size of the pitch angle is critical for the mechanical response of a Bouligand-inspired AM tool piece. For γ < 45° (small angle), interfacial crack growth and interfacial microcracking is observed. For 45° < γ < 90° (large pitch angle), dominant crack growth through the solid is observed.

=== Battery Electrodes ===
Crab shells which already have the Bouligand structure can be used as templates for nanostructured battery electrodes. Crab shells are a low-cost, sustainable alternative to otherwise expensive starting materials and processing methods for nanostructures batteries. The crab shells have a Bouligand structure composed of highly mineralized chitin fibers. The structure can be used as a bio-template to make hollow carbon nanofibers. The desired battery materials, often sulfur and silicon, can be contained in these hollow fibers to create the cathodes and anodes.

=== Nanocellulose Films ===
Cellulose nanocrystals self assemble into helicoidal thin films, the pitch angle between the layers can then be modified via solvent processing. The resulting nanocellulose films, which have a Bouligand structure, can be manipulated to achieve various effects on the material properties. These nanocellulose films are impact-resistant, sustainable, and multi-functional and can be used in various applications such as stretchable electronics, protective coatings, eyewear, and body armor.

=== Composite adhesive joint structures ===
Recent research has explored the application of Bouligand (helicoidal) architectures in adhesively bonded composite joints. In these structures, the gradual rotation of fiber orientation through the laminate thickness mimics natural Bouligand patterns observed in biological materials. Such configurations have been investigated for their potential to improve damage tolerance, energy absorption, and mechanical performance compared with conventional unidirectional or quasi-isotropic composite laminates. Experimental studies on carbon fiber–reinforced polymer (CFRP) single-lap adhesive joints indicate that helicoidal stacking sequences can enhance load-bearing capacity and increase failure displacement under multi-directional and multi-rate tensile loading conditions.

Related studies on bio-inspired CFRP laminates have also shown that gradual helicoidal stacking sequences can improve transverse tensile strength and fracture toughness, suggesting potential advantages of Bouligand-inspired designs for structural composite applications.

Further research has extended this concept to the design and mechanical analysis of bio-inspired adhesive joints, providing a comprehensive evaluation of the structural response of helicoidal CFRP joints and highlighting their relevance for engineering applications inspired by natural hierarchical structures.
