= Spider silk =

Protein fiber made by spiders

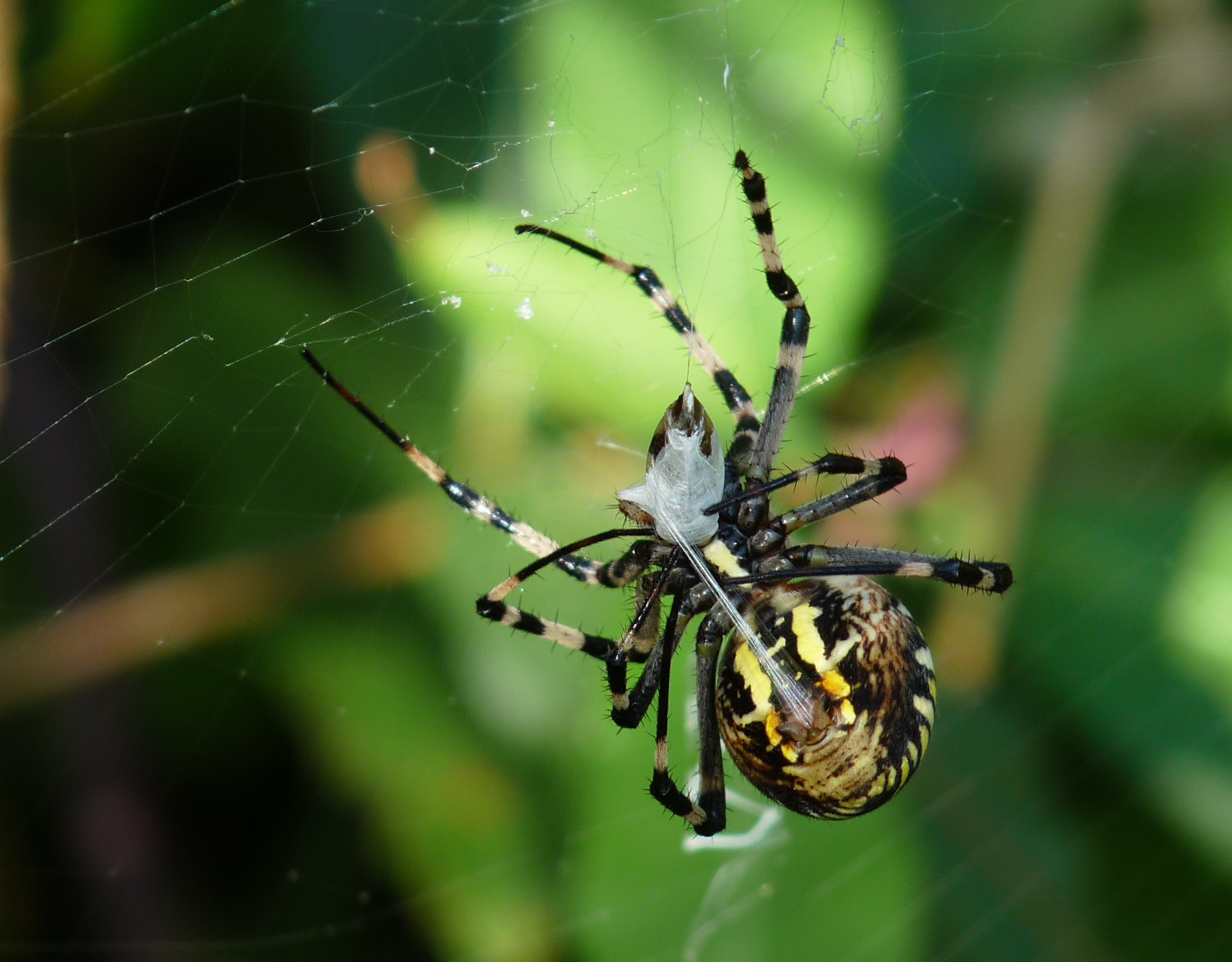
A female specimen of Argiope bruennichi wraps her prey in silk.

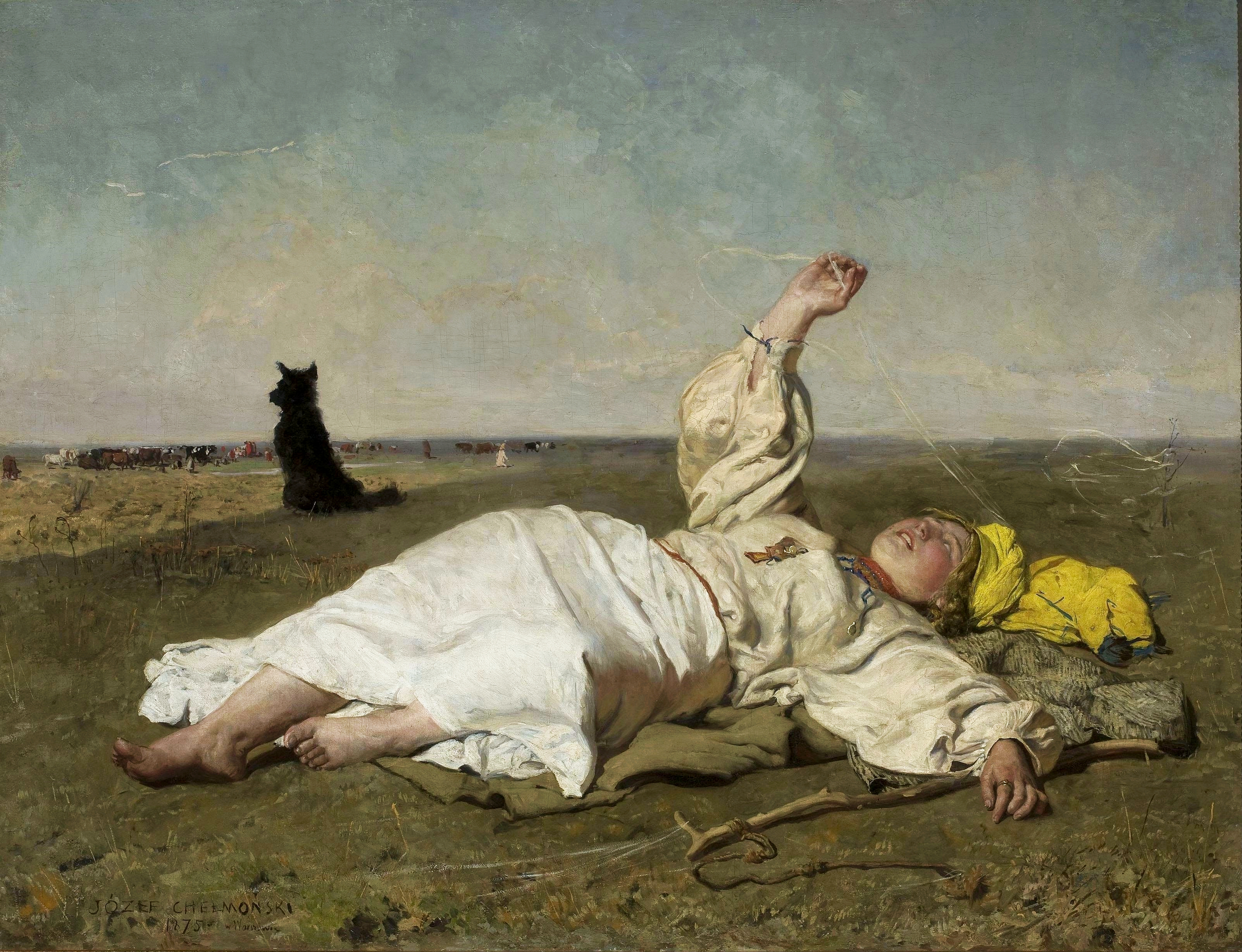
Indian Summer by Józef Chełmoński (1875, National Museum in Warsaw) depicts a peasant woman with a thread of gossamer in her hand.

Spider silk is a protein fibre or silk spun by spiders. Spiders use silk to make webs or other structures that function as adhesive traps to catch prey, to entangle and restrain prey before biting, to transmit tactile information, or as nests or cocoons to protect their offspring. They can use the silk to suspend themselves from height, to float through the air, or to glide away from predators. Most spiders vary the thickness and adhesiveness of their silk according to its use.

In some cases, spiders may use silk as a food source. While methods have been developed to collect silk from a spider by force, gathering silk from many spiders is more difficult than from silk-spinning organisms such as silkworms.

All spiders produce silk, although some spiders do not make webs. Silk is tied to courtship and mating. Silk produced by females provides a transmission channel for male vibratory courtship signals, while webs and draglines provide a substrate for female sex pheromones. Observations of male spiders producing silk during sexual interactions are common across widespread taxa. The function of male-produced silk in mating has received little study.

== Properties ==
=== Structural ===
Spider silk structure: crystalline beta-sheets separated by amorphous linkages

Silks have a hierarchical structure. The primary structure is the amino acid sequence of its proteins (spidroin), mainly consisting of highly repetitive glycine and alanine blocks, which is why silks are often referred to as block co-polymers. On a secondary level, the short side-chained alanine is mainly found in the crystalline domains (beta sheets) of the nanofibril. Glycine is mostly found in the so-called amorphous matrix consisting of helical and beta turn structures. The interplay between the hard crystalline segments and the strained elastic semi-amorphous regions gives spider silk its extraordinary properties. Various compounds other than protein are used to enhance the fibre's properties. Pyrrolidine has hygroscopic properties that keep the silk moist while warding off ant invasion. It occurs in high concentration in glue threads. Potassium hydrogen phosphate releases hydrogen ions in aqueous solution, resulting in a pH of about 4, making the silk acidic and thus protecting it from fungi and bacteria that would otherwise digest the protein. Potassium nitrate is believed to prevent the protein from denaturing in the acidic milieu.

Termonia introduced this basic model of silk in 1994. He suggested crystallites embedded in an amorphous matrix interlinked with hydrogen bonds. Refinements to this model include the discovery of semi-crystalline regions and a fibrillar skin-core model suggested for spider silk, later visualized by atomic force microscopy (AFM) and transmission electron microscopy (TEM). Sizes of the nanofibrillar structure and the crystalline and semi-crystalline regions were revealed by neutron scattering.

The fibres' microstructural information and macroscopic mechanical properties are related. Ordered regions (i) mainly reorient by deformation for low-stretched fibres and (ii) the fraction of ordered regions increases progressively for higher fibre stretching.

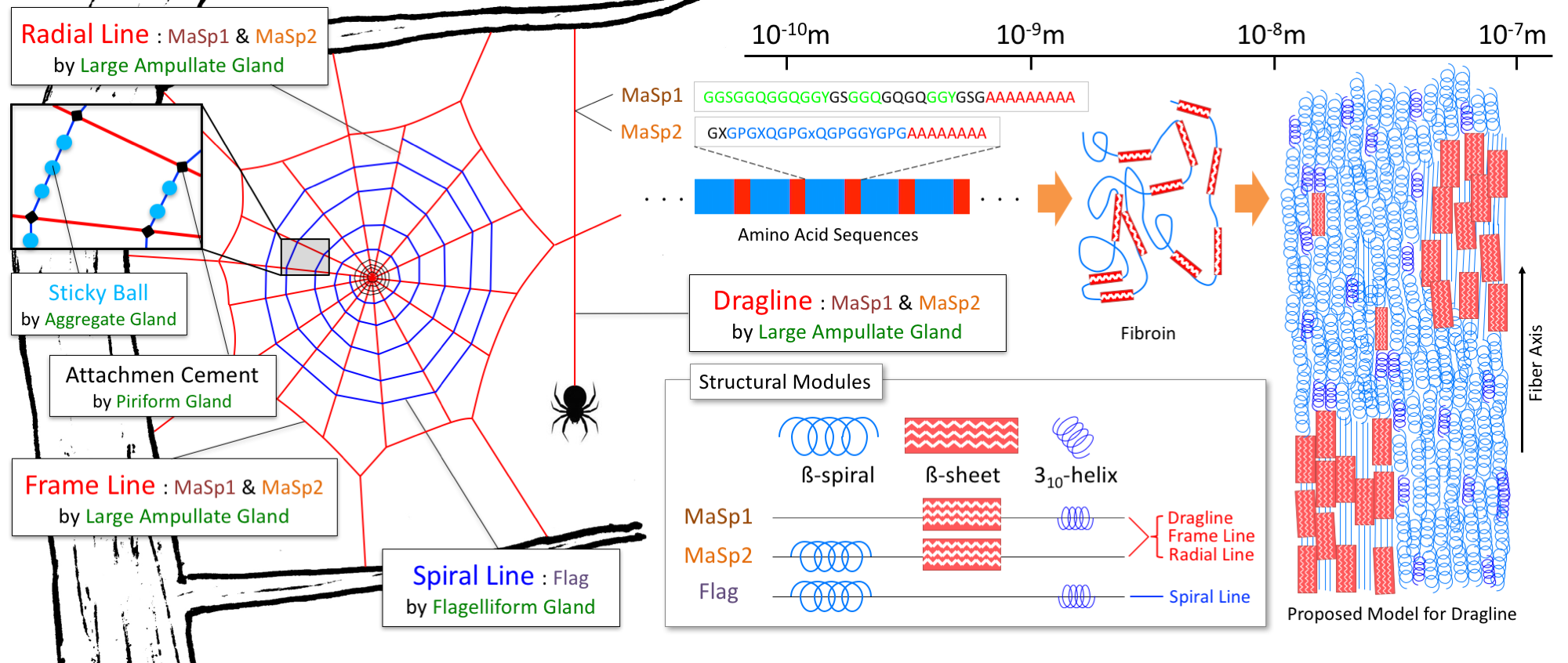
Schematic of the spider's orb web, structural modules, and spider silk structure. On the left is shown a schematic drawing of an orb web. The red lines represent the dragline, radial line, and frame lines. The blue lines represent the spiral line, and the centre of the orb web is called the "hub". Sticky balls drawn in blue are made at equal intervals on the spiral line with viscous material secreted from the aggregate gland. Attachment cement secreted from the piriform gland is used to connect and fix different lines. Microscopically, the spider silk secondary structure is formed of spidroin with the structure shown on the right side. In the dragline and radial line, a crystalline β-sheet and an amorphous helical structure are interwoven. The large amount of β-spiral structure gives elastic properties to the capture part of the orb web. In the structural modules diagram, a microscopic structure of dragline and radial lines is shown, composed mainly of two proteins of MaSp1 and MaSp2, as shown in the upper central part. The spiral line has no crystalline β-sheet region.

=== Mechanical ===
Each spider and each type of silk has a set of mechanical properties optimised for their biological function.

Most silks, in particular dragline silk, have exceptional mechanical properties. They exhibit a unique combination of high tensile strength and extensibility (ductility). This enables a silk fibre to absorb a large amount of energy before breaking (toughness, the area under a stress-strain curve).

An illustration of the differences between toughness, stiffness and strength

Strength and toughness are distinct quantities. Weight for weight, silk is stronger than steel, but not as strong as Kevlar. Spider silk is, however, tougher than both.

The variability of spider silk fibre mechanical properties is related to their degree of molecular alignment. Mechanical properties also depend on ambient conditions, i.e. humidity and temperature.

==== Young's modulus ====
Young's modulus is the resistance to deformation elastically along the tensile force direction. Unlike steel or Kevlar, which are stiff, spider silk is ductile and elastic, having a lower Young's modulus. According to Spider Silkome Database, Ariadna lateralis silk has the highest Young's modulus with 37 GPa, compared to 208 GPa for steel and 112 GPa for Kevlar.

==== Tensile strength ====
A dragline silk's tensile strength is comparable to that of high-grade alloy steel (450−2000 MPa), and about half as strong as aramid filaments, such as Twaron or Kevlar (3000 MPa). According to Spider Silkome Database, Clubiona vigil silk has the highest tensile strength.

==== Density ====
Consisting of mainly protein, silks are about a sixth of the density of steel (1.3 g/cm^{3}). As a result, a strand long enough to circle the Earth would weigh about 2 kilograms (4.4 lb). (Spider dragline silk has a tensile strength of roughly 1.3 GPa. The tensile strength listed for steel might be slightly higher – e.g. 1.65 GPa, but spider silk is a much less dense material, so that a given weight of spider silk is five times as strong as the same weight of steel.)

==== Energy density ====
The energy density of dragline spider silk is roughly 1.2×10^{8} J/m^{3}.

==== Ductility ====
Silks are ductile, with some able to stretch up to five times their relaxed length without breaking.

==== Toughness ====
The combination of strength and ductility gives dragline silks a high toughness (or work to fracture), which "equals that of commercial polyaramid (aromatic nylon) filaments, which themselves are benchmarks of modern polymer fibre technology". According to Spider Silkome Database, Araneus ishisawai silk is the toughest.

==== Elongation at break ====
Elongation at break compares initial object length to final length at break. According to Spider Silkome Database, Caerostris darwini silk has the highest strain at break for any spider silk, breaking at 65% extension.

==== Temperature ====
While unlikely to be relevant in nature, dragline silks can hold their strength below -40 °C (-40 °F) and up to 220 °C (428 °F). As occurs in many materials, spider silk fibres undergo a glass transition. The glass-transition temperature depends on humidity, as water is a plasticiser for spider silk.

==== Supercontraction ====
When exposed to water, dragline silks undergo supercontraction, shrinking up to 50% in length and behaving like a weak rubber under tension. Many hypotheses have attempted to explain its use in nature, most popularly to re-tension webs built in the night using the morning dew.

==== Highest-performance ====
The toughest known spider silk is produced by the species Darwin's bark spider (Caerostris darwini): "The toughness of forcibly silked fibers averages 350 MJ/m^{3}, with some samples reaching 520 MJ/m^{3}. Thus, C. darwini silk is more than twice as tough as any previously described silk and over 10 times tougher than Kevlar".

=== Adhesive ===
Silk fibre is a two-compound pyriform secretion, spun into patterns (called "attachment discs") using a minimum of silk substrate. The pyriform threads polymerise under ambient conditions, become functional immediately, and are usable indefinitely, remaining biodegradable, versatile and compatible with other materials in the environment. The adhesive and durability properties of the attachment disc are controlled by functions within the spinnerets. Some adhesive properties of the silk resemble glue, consisting of microfibrils and lipid enclosures.

== Uses ==
All spiders produce silks, and a single spider can produce up to seven different types of silk for different uses. This is in contrast to insect silks, where an individual usually only produces a single type. Spiders use silks in many ways, in accord with the silk's properties. As spiders have evolved, so have their silks' complexity and uses, for example from primitive tube webs 300–400 million years ago to complex orb webs 110 million years ago.

Use	Example	Reference
Prey capture	Orb webs produced by the Araneidae (typical orb-weavers); tube webs; tangle webs; sheet webs; lace webs, dome webs; single thread used by the Bolas spiders for "fishing".	
Prey immobilisation	"Swathing bands" to envelop prey. Often combined with immobilising prey using a venom. In species of Scytodes the silk is combined with venom and squirted from the chelicerae.	
Reproduction	Male spiders may produce sperm webs; spider eggs are covered in silk cocoons.	
Dispersal	"Ballooning" or "kiting" used by smaller spiders to float through the air, for instance for dispersal.	
Food	The kleptoparasitic Argyrodes eats the silk of host spider webs. Some daily weavers of temporary webs eat their own unused silk, thus mitigating an otherwise heavy metabolic expense.	
Nest lining and nest construction	Tube webs used by "primitive" spiders such as the European tube web spider (Segestria florentina). Threads radiate out of the nest to provide a sensory link to the outside. Silk is a component of the lids of spiders that use "trapdoors", such as members of the family Ctenizidae, and the "water" or "diving bell" spider Argyroneta aquatica forms a silk diving bell.	
Guide lines	Some spiders that venture from shelter leave a silk trail by which to find their way home again.	
Drop lines and anchor lines	Spiders such as the Salticidae venture from shelter and leave a trail of silk, use that as an emergency line in case of falling from inverted or vertical surfaces. Others, even web dwellers, deliberately drop from a web when alarmed, using a silken thread as a drop line by which they can return in due course. Some, such as species of Paramystaria, hang from a drop line while feeding.	
Alarm lines	Some spiders that do not spin actual traps build alarm webs that the feet of their prey (such as ants) can disturb, cueing the spider to pounce on prey or flee a formidable intruder.	
Pheromonal trails	Some wandering spiders leave a largely continuous trail of silk impregnated with pheromones that the opposite sex can follow to find a mate.	

== Silk types ==
a) Major ampullate silk - Frame, radii, dragline; b) Minor ampullate silk - Auxiliary spiral and web reinforcement; c) Flagelliform silk - Capture spiral; d) Piriform silk - Attachment to substrates; e) Tubuliform silk - Egg sac; f) Aciniform silk - Prey wrapping, egg sac; g) Aggregate silk - Sticky coating for the capture spiral

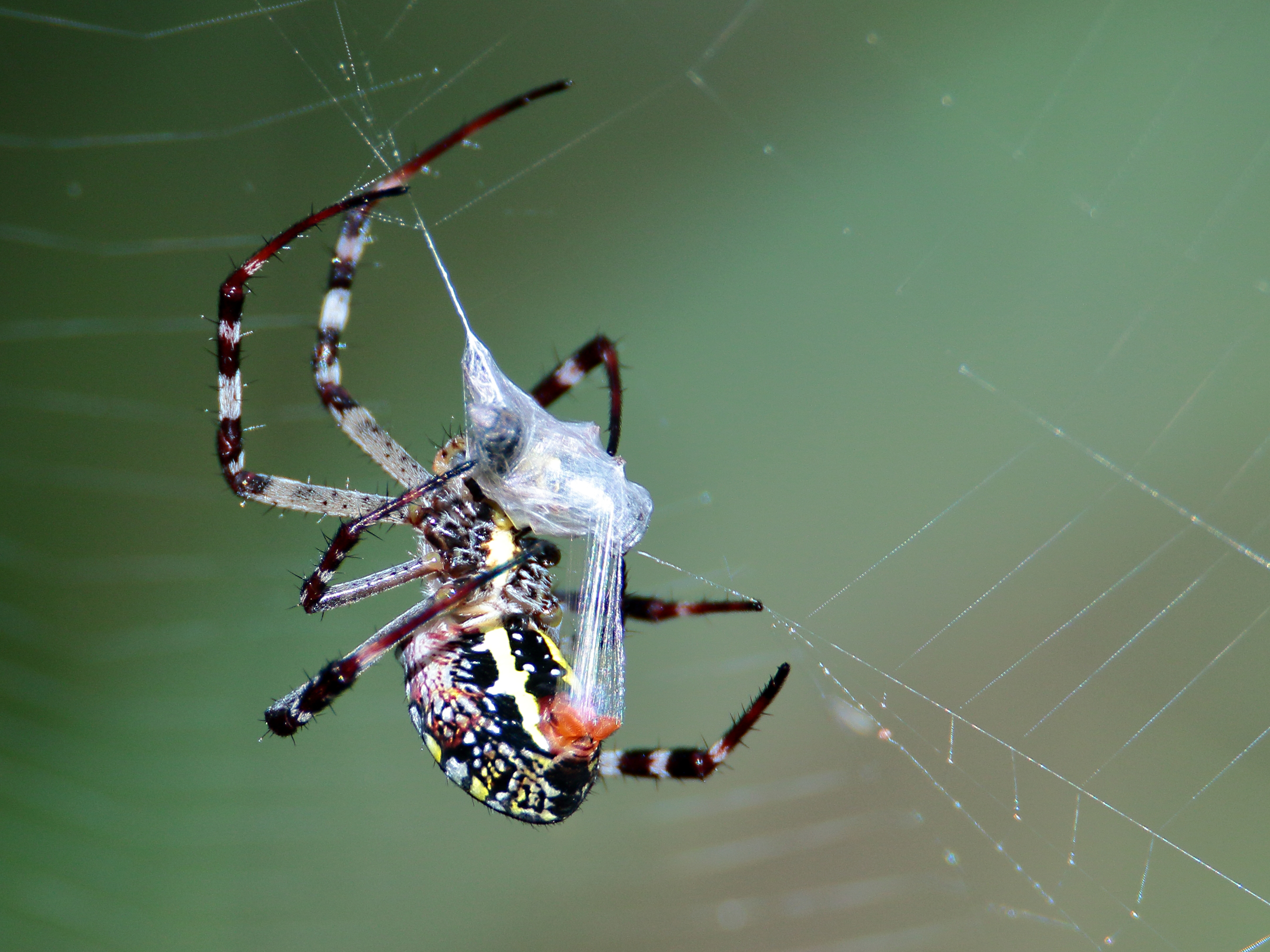
A female Argiope picta immobilizing prey by wrapping a curtain of aciniform silk around the insect for later consumption

Crab spider jumps with safety line, on yellow ironweed. Repeated at variable slow motion to better see silk line. Spider probably Misumessus oblongus.

Meeting the specification for all these ecological uses requires different types of silk presenting different properties, as either a fibre, a structure of fibres, or a globule. These types include glues and fibres. Some types of fibres are used for structural support, others for protective structures. Some can absorb energy effectively, whereas others transmit vibration efficiently. These silk types are produced in different glands; so the silk from a particular gland can be linked to its use.

Gland	Silk Use
Ampullate (major)	Dragline silk – used for the web's outer rim and spokes, also for lifeline and for ballooning
Ampullate (minor)	Used for temporary scaffolding during web construction
Flagelliform	Capture-spiral silk – used for the capturing lines of the web
Tubuliform	Egg cocoon silk – used for egg sacs
Aciniform	Used to wrap and secure prey; used in male sperm webs; used in stabilimenta
Aggregate	Sticky globules
Piriform	Bonds between separate threads for attachment point.

Many species have different glands to produce silk with different properties for different purposes, including housing, web construction, defence, capturing and detaining prey, egg protection, and mobility (fine "gossamer" thread for ballooning, or for a strand allowing the spider to drop down as silk is extruded).

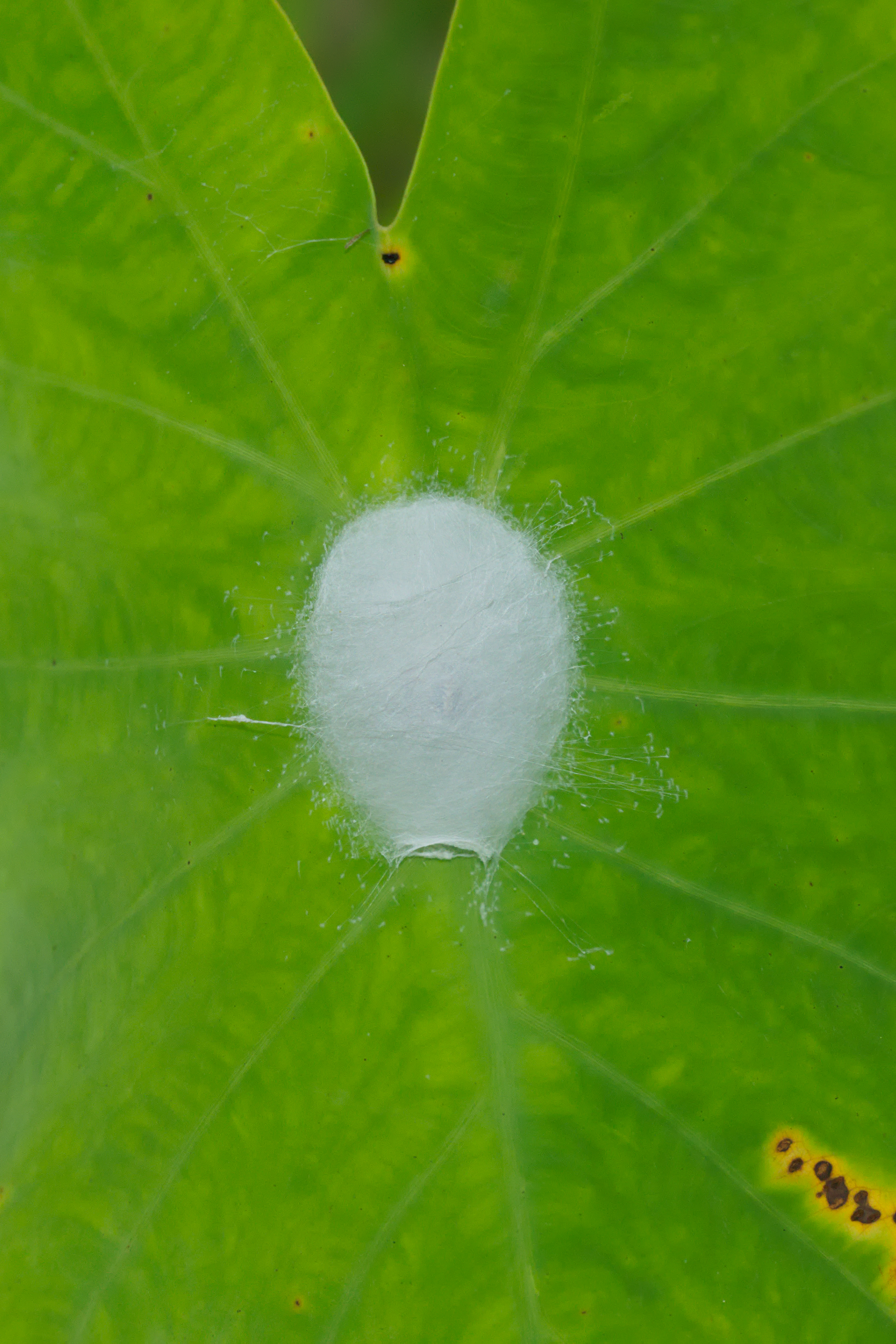
Spider cocoon

Silk	Use
Major-ampullate (dragline) silk	The web's outer rim and spokes and the lifeline. Can be as strong per unit weight as steel, but much tougher.
Capture-spiral (flagelliform) silk	Capturing lines. Sticky, stretchy, and tough. The capture spiral is sticky due to droplets of aggregate (a spider glue) that are placed on the spiral. The elasticity of flagelliform allows enough time for the aggregate to adhere to the aerial prey flying into the web.
Tubiliform (a.k.a. cylindriform) silk	Protective egg sacs. Stiffest silk.
Aciniform silk	Wrap and secure prey. Two to three times as tough as the other silks, including dragline.
Minor-ampullate silk	Temporary scaffolding during web construction.

== Synthesis and fibre spinning ==
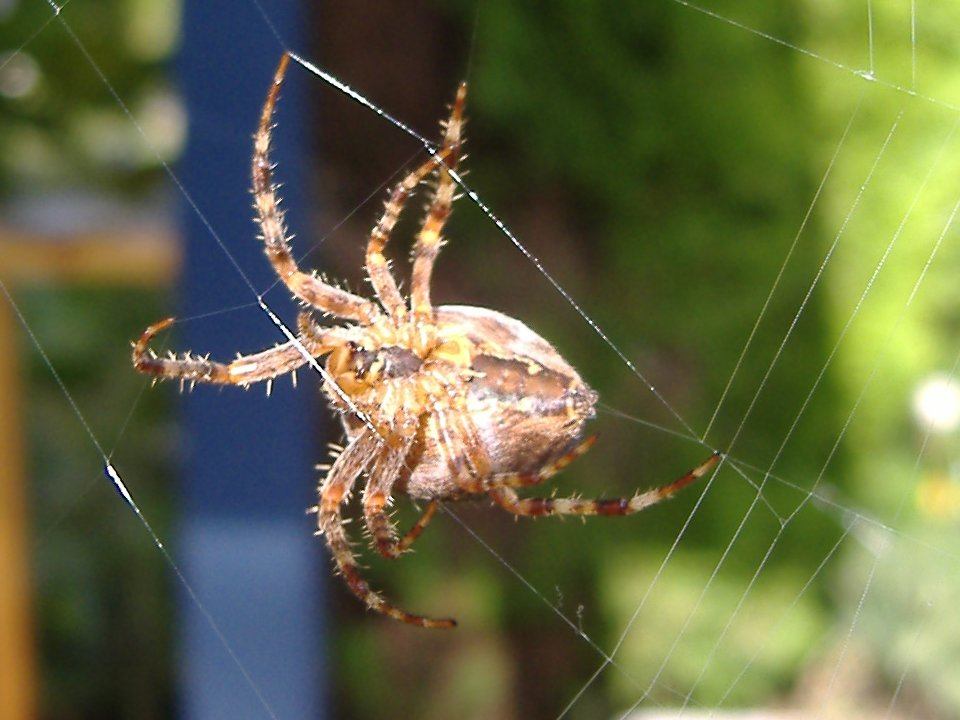
A garden spider spinning its web

Silk production differs in an important aspect from that of most other fibrous biomaterials. It is pulled on demand from a precursor out of specialised glands, rather than continuously grown like plant cell walls.

The spinning process occurs when a fibre is pulled away from the body of a spider, whether by the spider's legs, by the spider's falling under its own weight, or by any other method. The term "spinning" is misleading because no rotation occurs. It comes from analogy to the textile spinning wheels. Silk production is a pultrusion, similar to extrusion, with the subtlety that the force is induced by pulling at the finished fibre rather than squeezing it out of a reservoir. The fibre is pulled through (possibly multiple) silk glands of multiple types.

=== Silk gland ===
Schematic of the spider's spinning apparatus and structural hierarchy in silk assembling related to assembly into fibers. In the process of dragline production, the primary structure protein is secreted first from secretory granules in the tail. In the ampullate (neutral environment, pH = 7), the proteins form a soft micelle of several tens of nanometers by self-organization because the hydrophilic terminals are excluded. In ampullate, the concentration of the protein is high. Then, the micelles are squeezed into the duct. The long axis direction of the molecules is aligned parallel to the duct by a mechanical frictional force and partially oriented. The continuous lowering of pH from 7.5 to 8.0 in the tail to presumably close to 5.0 occurs at the end of the duct. Ion exchange, acidification, and water removal all happen in the duct. The shear and elongational forces lead to phase separation. In the acidic bath of the duct, the molecules attain a high concentration liquid crystal state. Finally, the silk is spun from the taper exterior. The molecules become more stable helixes and β-sheets from the liquid crystal.

The gland's visible, or external, part is termed the spinneret. Depending on the complexity of the species, spiders have two to eight spinnerets, usually in pairs. Species have varying specialised glands, ranging from a sac with an opening at one end, to the complex, multiple-section ampullate glands of the golden silk orb-weavers.

Behind each spinneret on the surface of the spider lies a gland, a generalised form of which is shown in the figure.

Gland characteristics

Schematic of a generalised gland of a Golden silk orb-weaver. Each differently coloured section highlights a discrete section of the gland.

1. The leftmost section is the secretory or tail section. The walls of this section are lined with cells that secrete proteins Spidroin I and Spidroin II, the main components of this spider's dragline. These proteins are found in the form of droplets that gradually elongate to form long channels along the length of the final fibre, hypothesised to assist in preventing crack formation or self-healing.
2. The ampulla (storage sac) is next. This stores and maintains the gel-like unspun silk dope. In addition, it secretes proteins that coat the surface of the final fibre.
3. The funnel rapidly reduces the large diameter of the storage sac to the small diameter of the tapering duct.
4. The final length is the tapering duct, the site of most of the fibre formation. This consists of a tapering tube with several tight sharp turns, a valve near the end includes a spigot from which the solid silk fibre emerges. The tube tapers hyperbolically, therefore the unspun silk is under constant elongational shear stress, an important factor in fibre formation. This section is lined with cells that exchange ions, reduce the dope pH from neutral to acidic, and remove water from the fibre. Collectively, the shear stress and the ion and pH changes induce the liquid silk dope to undergo a phase transition and condense into a solid protein fibre with high molecular organisation. The spigot at the end has lips that clamp around the fibre, controlling fibre diameter and further retaining water.
5. Almost at the end is a valve. Though discovered some time ago, its precise purpose is still under discussion. It is believed to assist in restarting and rejoining broken fibres, acting much in the way of a helical pump, regulating the thickness of the fibre, and/or clamping the fibre as a spider falls upon it. The similarity of the silk worm's silk press and the roles each of these valves play in the silk production in these two organisms are under discussion.

Throughout the process the silk appears to have a nematic texture, in a manner similar to a liquid crystal, arising in part due to the high protein concentration of silk dope (around 30% in terms of weight per volume). This allows the silk to flow through the duct as a liquid while maintaining molecular order.

As an example of a complex spinning field, the spinneret apparatus of an adult Araneus diadematus (garden cross spider) consists of many glands shown below. A similar gland architecture appears in the black widow spider.

- 500 pyriform glands for attachment points
- 4 ampullate glands for the web frame
- 300 aciniform glands for the outer lining of egg sacs, and for ensnaring prey
- 4 tubuliform glands for egg sac silk
- 4 aggregate glands for adhesive functions
- 2 coronate glands for the thread of adhesion lines

== Artificial synthesis ==
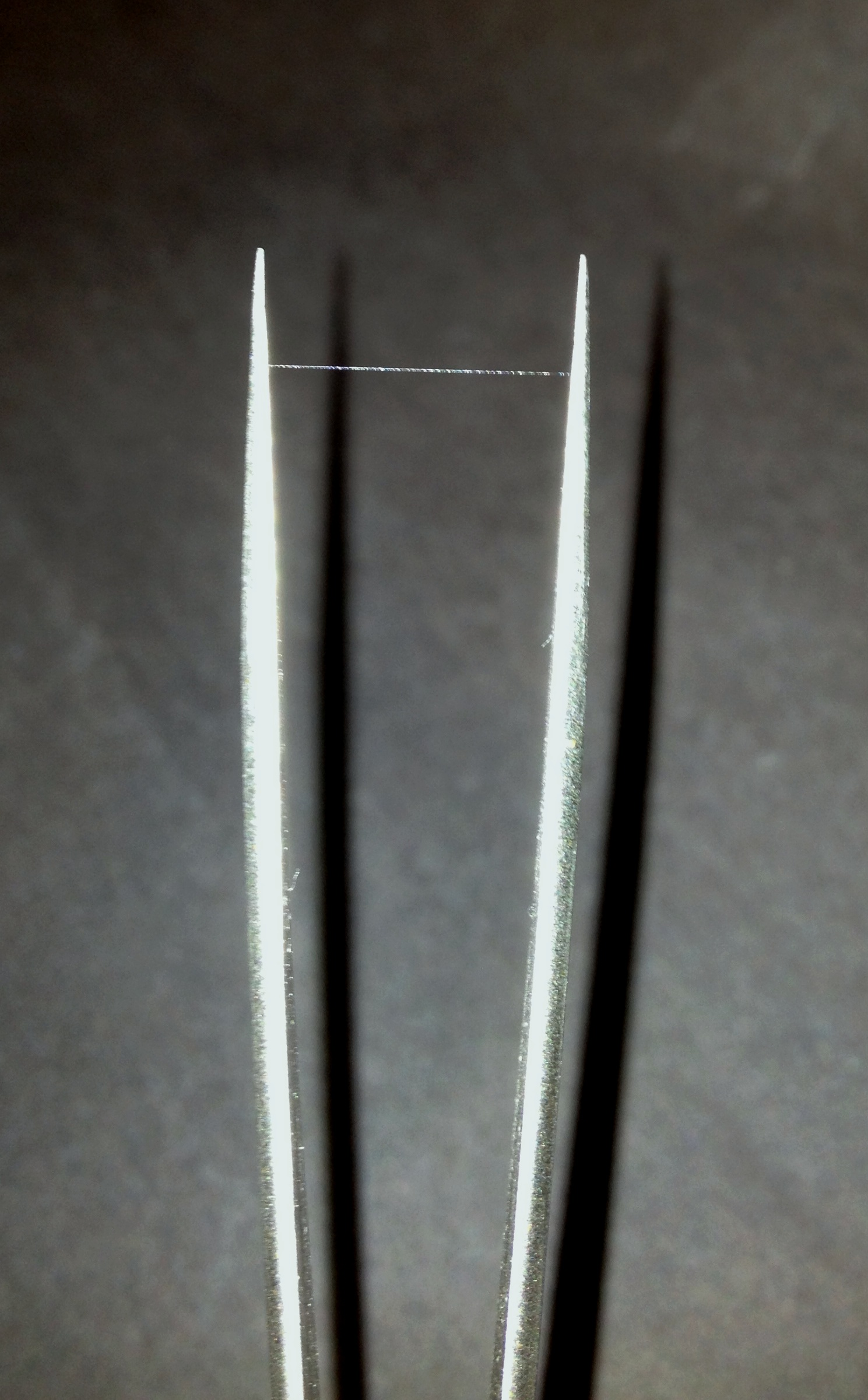
Single strand of artificial spider silk produced under laboratory conditions

To artificially synthesise spider silk into fibres, two broad tasks are required. These are synthesis of the feedstock (the unspun silk dope in spiders), and synthesis of the production conditions (the funnel, valve, tapering duct, and spigot). Few strategies have produced silk that can efficiently be synthesised into fibres.

=== Feedstock ===
The molecular structure of unspun silk is both complex and long. Though this endows the fibres with desirable properties, it also complicates replication. Various organisms have been used as a basis for attempts to replicate necessary protein components. These proteins must then be extracted, purified, and then spun before their properties can be tested.

Organism	Details	Average Maximum breaking stress (MPa)	Average Strain (%)	Reference
Darwin's bark spider (Caerostris darwini)	Malagasy spider famed for making 25 m long strands. "C. darwini silk is more than twice as tough as any previously described silk"	1850 ±350	33 ±0.08	
Nephila clavipes	Typical golden orb weaving spider	710–1200	18–27	
Bombyx mori Silkworms	Silkworms genetically altered to express spider proteins and fibres.	660	18.5	
Escherichia coli	Synthesising a large and repetitive molecule (~300 kDa) is complex, but required for the strongest silk. Here E. coli was engineered to produce a 556 kDa protein. Fibers spun from these synthetic spidroins are the first to fully replicate the mechanical performance of natural spider silk by all common metrics.	1030 ±110	18 ±6	
Goats	Genetically modified to secrete silk proteins in their milk.	285–250	30–40	
Tobacco & potato plants	Genetically modified to produce silk proteins. Patents were granted in 2010, but no fibres have yet been described.	n/a	n/a	

=== Geometry ===
Spider silks with comparatively simple molecular structure need complex ducts to be able to form an effective fibre. Approaches:

==== Syringe and needle ====
Feedstock is forced through a hollow needle using a syringe.

Although cheap and easy to produce, gland shape and conditions are loosely approximated. Fibres created using this method may need encouragement to solidify by removing water from the fibre with chemicals such as (environmentally undesirable) methanol or acetone, and also may require later stretching of the fibre to achieve desirable properties.

==== Superhydrophobic surfaces ====
Placing a solution of spider silk on a superhydrophobic surface can generate sheets, particles, and nanowires of spider silk.

==== Sheets ====
Self-assembly of silk at standing liquid-gas interphases of a solution tough and strong sheets. These sheets are now explored for mimicking the basal membrane in tissue modeling.

==== Microfluidics ====
Microfluidics have the advantage of being controllable and able to test spin small volumes of unspun fibre, but setup and development costs are high. A patent has been granted and continuously spun fibres have achieved commercial use.

==== Electrospinning ====
Electrospinning is an old technique whereby a fluid is held in a container such that it flows out through capillary action. A conducting substrate is positioned below, and a difference in electrical potential is applied between the fluid and the substrate. The fluid is attracted to the substrate, and tiny fibres jump from their point of emission, the Taylor cone, to the substrate, drying as they travel. This method creates nano-scale fibres from silk dissected from organisms and regenerated silk fibroin.

=== Other shapes ===
Silk can be formed into other shapes and sizes such as spherical capsules for drug delivery, cell scaffolds and wound healing, textiles, cosmetics, coatings, and many others. Spider silk proteins can self-assemble on superhydrophobic surfaces into nanowires, as well as micron-sized circular sheets. Recombinant spider silk proteins can self-assemble at the liquid-air interface of a standing solution to form protein-permeable, strong and flexible nanomembranes that support cell proliferation. Potential applications include skin transplants, and supportive membranes in organ-on-a-chip. These nanomembranes have been used to create a static in-vitro model of a blood vessel.

=== Synthetic spider silk ===
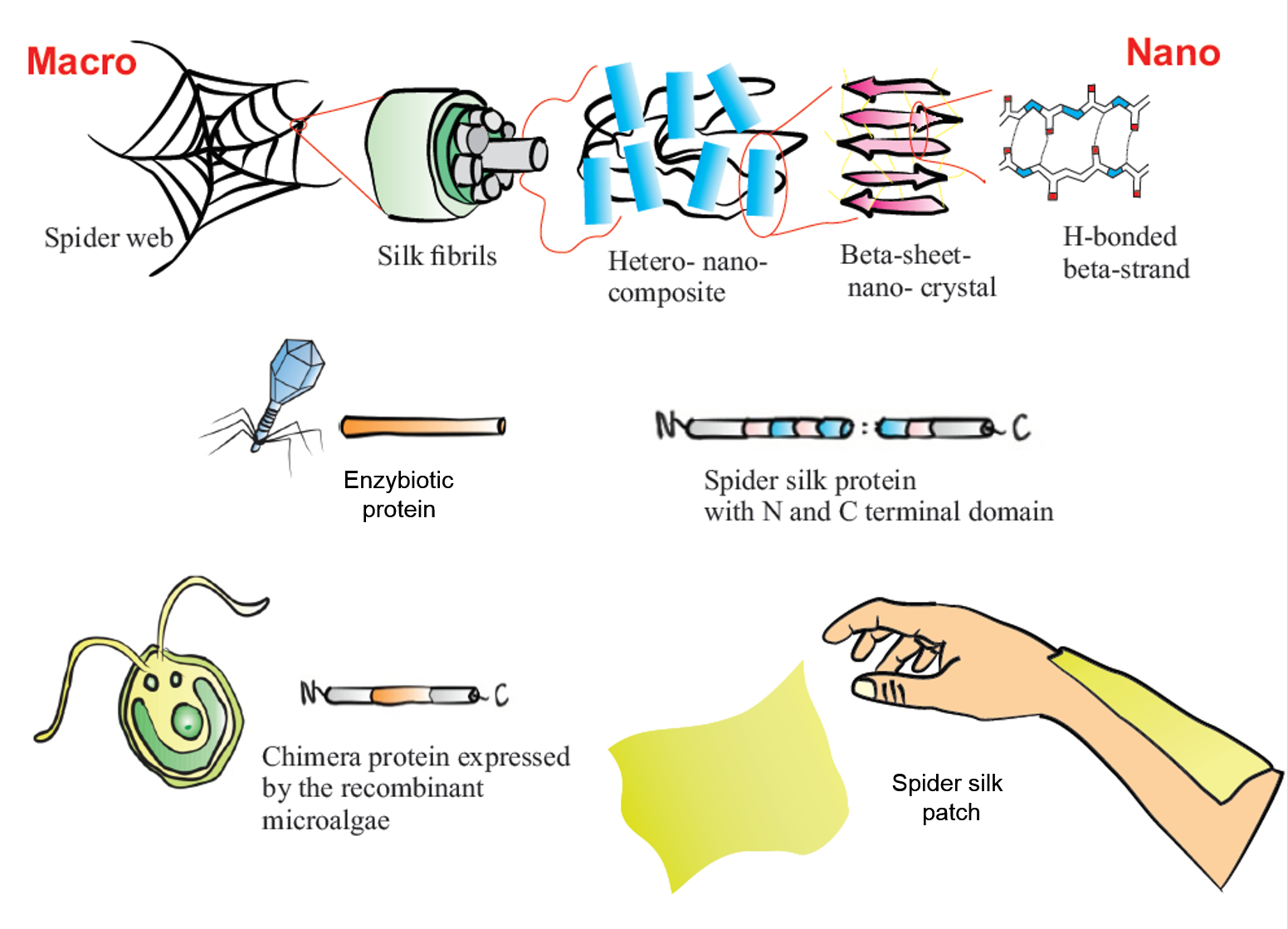
Proposed framework for producing artificial skin from spider silk to help patients with burns.

Replicating the complex conditions required to produce comparable fibres has challenged research and early-stage manufacturing. Through genetic engineering, E. coli bacteria, yeasts, plants, silkworms, and animals other than silkworms have been used to produce spider silk-like proteins, which have different characteristics than those from a spider. Extrusion of protein fibres in an aqueous environment is known as "wet-spinning". This process has produced silk fibres of diameters ranging from 10 to 60 μm, compared to diameters of 2.5–4 μm for natural spider silk. Artificial spider silks have fewer and simpler proteins than natural dragline silk, and consequently offer half the diameter, strength, and flexibility of natural dragline silk.

==== Research ====
- In March 2010, researchers from the Korea Advanced Institute of Science & Technology succeeded in making spider silk directly using E. coli modified with certain genes of the spider Nephila clavipes. This approach eliminates the need to "milk" spiders.
- A 556 kDa spider silk protein was manufactured from 192 repeat motifs of the N. clavipes dragline spidroin, having similar mechanical characteristics as their natural counterparts, i.e., tensile strength (1.03 ± 0.11 GPa), modulus (13.7 ± 3.0 GPa), extensibility (18 ± 6%), and toughness (114 ± 51 MJ/m3).
- AMSilk developed spidroin using bacteria.
- Bolt Threads produced a recombinant spidroin using yeast, for use in apparel fibers and personal care. They produced the first commercial apparel products made of recombinant spider silk, trademarked Microsilk, demonstrated in ties and beanies.
- Kraig Biocraft Laboratories used research from the Universities of Wyoming and Notre Dame to create silkworms genetically altered to produce spider silk.
- Defunct Canadian biotechnology company Nexia produced spider silk protein in transgenic goats; the milk produced by the goats contained significant quantities of the protein, 1–2 grams of silk proteins per litre of milk. Attempts to spin the protein into a fibre similar to natural spider silk resulted in fibres with tenacities of 2–3 grams per denier. Nexia used wet spinning and squeezed the silk protein solution through small extrusion holes to simulate the spinneret, but this was not sufficient to replicate native spider silk properties.
- Spiber produced a synthetic spider silk (Q/QMONOS). In partnership with Goldwin, a ski parka made from this was in testing in 2016.
- Researchers from Japan's RIKEN Center constructed an artificial gland that reproduced spider silk's molecular structure. Precise microfluidic mechanisms directed proteins to self-assemble into functional fibers. The process used negative pressure to pull (rather than push) a spidroin solution through the device. The resulting fibers matched the hierarchical structure of natural fiber.

== Research ==
Significant papers (50 or more citations)
Area of contribution	Year	Main researchers	Title	Contribution to the field
Chemical Basis	1960	Fischer, F. & Brander, J.	"Eine Analyse der Gespinste der Kreuzspinne" (Amino acid composition analysis of spider silk)	
Chemical Basis	1960	Lucas, F. et al.	"The Composition of Arthropod Silk Fibroins; Comparative studies of fibroins"	
Gene Sequence	1990	Xu, M. & Lewis, R. V.	"Structure of a Protein Superfiber − Spider Dragline Silk"	
Mechanical Properties	1964	Lucas, F.	"Spiders and their silks"	First time mechanical properties of spider silk compared with other materials in a scientific paper.
Mechanical Properties	1989	Vollrath, F. & Edmonds, D. T.	"Modulation of the Mechanical Properties of Spider Silk by Coating with Water"	First important paper suggesting the water interplay with spider silk fibroin modulating silk properties.
Mechanical Properties	2001	Vollrath, F. & Shao, Z.Z.	"The effect of spinning conditions on the mechanics of a spider's dragline silk"	
Mechanical Properties	2006	Plaza, G.R., Guinea, G.V., Pérez-Rigueiro, J. & Elices, M.	"Thermo-hygro-mechanical behavior of spider dragline silk: Glassy and rubbery states"	Combined effect of humidity and temperature on mechanical properties. Glass-transition temperature dependence on humidity.
Structural Characterisation	1992	Hinman, M.B. & Lewis, R. V	"Isolation of a clone encoding a second dragline silk fibroin. Nephila clavipes dragline silk is a two-protein fiber"	
Structural Characterisation	1994	Simmons, A. et al.	"Solid-State C-13 Nmr of Nephila-Clavipes Dragline Silk Establishes Structure and Identity of Crystalline Regions"	First NMR study of spider silk.
Structural Characterisation	1999	Shao, Z., Vollrath, F. et al.	"Analysis of spider silk in native and supercontracted states using Raman spectroscopy"	First Raman study of spider silk.
Structural Characterisation	1999	Riekel, C., Muller, M.et al.	"Aspects of X-ray diffraction on single spider fibers"	First X-ray on single spider silk fibres.
Structural Characterisation	2000	Knight, D.P., Vollrath, F. et al.	"Beta transition and stress-induced phase separation in the spinning of spider dragline silk"	Secondary structural transition confirmation during spinning.
Structural Characterisation	2001	Riekel, C. & Vollrath, F.	"Spider silk fibre extrusion: combined wide- and small-angle X- ray microdiffraction experiments"	First X-ray on spider silk dope.
Structural Characterisation	2002	Van Beek, J. D. et al.	"The molecular structure of spider dragline silk: Folding and orientation of the protein backbone"	
Structure-Property Relationship	1986	Gosline, G.M. et al.	"The structure and properties of spider silk"	First attempt to link structure with properties of spider silk
Structure-Property Relationship	1994	Termonia, Y	"Molecular Modeling of Spider Silk Elasticity"	X-ray evidence presented in this paper; simple model of crystallites embedded in amorphous regions.
Structure-Property Relationship	1996	Simmons, A. et al.	"Molecular orientation and two-component nature of the crystalline fraction of spider dragline silk"	Two types of alanine-rich crystalline regions were defined.
Structure-Property Relationship	2006	Vollrath, F. & Porter, D.	"Spider silk as an archetypal protein elastomer"	New insight and model to spider silk based on Group Interaction Modelling.
Native Spinning	1991	Kerkam, K., Kaplan, D. et al.	"Liquid Crystallinity of Natural Silk Secretions"	
Native Spinning	1999	Knight, D.P. & Vollrath, F.	"Liquid crystals and flow elongation in a spider's silk production line"	
Native Spinning	2001	Vollrath, F. & Knight, D.P.	"Liquid crystalline spinning of spider silk"	Most cited spider silk paper
Native Spinning	2005	Guinea, G.V., Elices, M., Pérez-Rigueiro, J. & Plaza, G.R.	"Stretching of supercontracted fibers: a link between spinning and the variability of spider silk"	Explanation of the variability of mechanical properties.
Reconstituted /Synthetic Spider Silk and Artificial Spinning	1995	Prince, J. T., Kaplan, D. L. et al.	"Construction, Cloning, and Expression of Synthetic Genes Encoding Spider Dragline Silk"	First successful synthesis of Spider silk by E. coli.
Reconstituted /Synthetic Spider Silk and Artificial Spinning	1998	Arcidiacono, S., Kaplan, D.L. et al.	"Purification and characterization of recombinant spider silk expressed in Escherichia coli"	
Reconstituted /Synthetic Spider Silk and Artificial Spinning	1998	Seidel, A., Jelinski, L.W. et al.	"Artificial Spinning of Spider Silk"	First controlled wet-spinning of reconstituted spider silk.

== Human uses ==
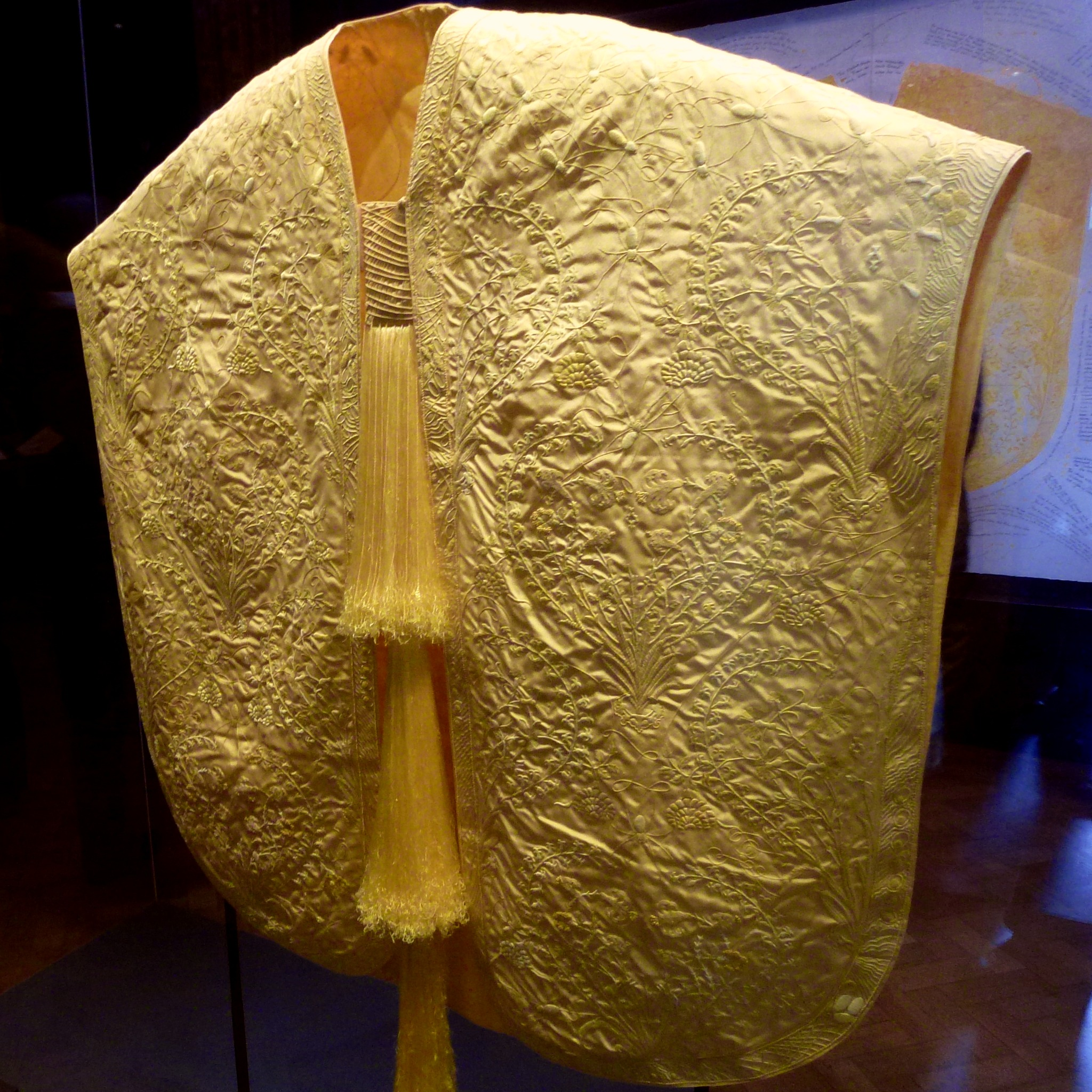
A cape made from Madagascar golden orb spider silk

The earliest recorded attempt to weave fabric from spider silk was in 1709 by François Xavier Bon who, using a process similar to creating silkworm silk, wove silk derived from spider's egg cocoons into stockings and gloves. Fifty years later Jesuit missionary Ramón M. Termeyer invented a reeling device for harvesting spider silk directly from spiders, allowing it to be spun into threads. Neither Bon nor Termeyer were successful in producing commercially viable quantities.

The development of methods to mass-produce spider silk led to the manufacturing of military, medical, and consumer goods, such as ballistic armour, athletic footwear, personal care products, breast implant and catheter coatings, mechanical insulin pumps, fashion clothing, and outerwear. However, due to the difficulties in extracting and processing, the largest known piece of cloth made of spider silk is an 11-by-4-foot (3.4 by 1.2 m) textile with a golden tint made in Madagascar in 2009. Eighty-two people worked for four years to collect over one million golden orb spiders and extract silk from them. In 2012, spider silk fibres were used to create a set of violin strings.

=== Medicine ===
Peasants in the southern Carpathian Mountains used to cut up tubes built by Atypus and cover wounds with the inner lining. It reportedly facilitated healing, and connected with the skin. This is believed to be due to the silk's antiseptic properties, and because silk is rich in vitamin K, which can aid in clotting blood. N. clavipes silk was used in research concerning mammalian neuronal regeneration.

=== Science and technology ===
Spider silk has been used as a thread for crosshairs in optical instruments such as telescopes, microscopes, and telescopic rifle sights. In 2011, silk fibres were used to generate fine diffraction patterns over N-slit interferometric signals used in optical communications. Silk has been used to create biolenses that could be used in conjunction with lasers to create high-resolution images of the inside of the human body.

Silk has been used to suspend inertial confinement fusion targets during laser ignition, as it remains considerably elastic and has a high energy to break at temperatures as low as 10–20 K. In addition, it is made from "light" atomic number elements that emit no x-rays during irradiation that could preheat the target, limiting the pressure differential required for fusion.

== See also ==
- Biomimetics – Imitation of biological systems for the solving of human problems
- Recombinant DNA – DNA molecules formed by human agency at a molecular level generating novel DNA sequences
