= Adam Rutherford =

British geneticist, author, and broadcaster (born 1975)

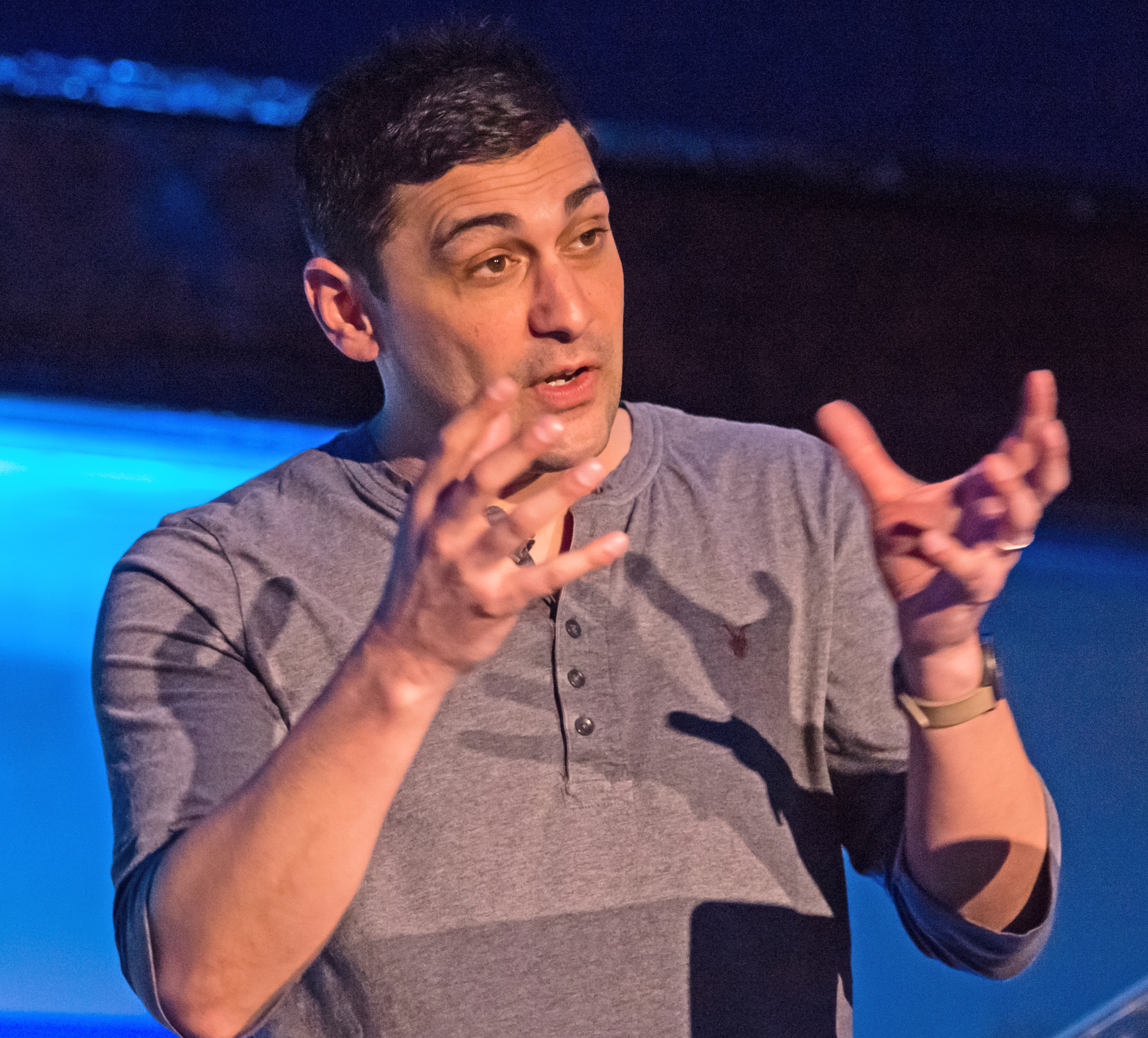
- Rutherford at QED, 2013
- Born: Adam David Rutherford; January 1975 (age 51); Ipswich, Suffolk, England
- Citizenship: British, New Zealand
- Education: Ipswich School
- Alma mater: University College London (BSc, PhD)
- Known for: Inside Science
- Awards: David Attenborough Award and Lecture, 2021
- Scientific career
- Fields: Genetics; History of eugenics; Race science
- Thesis: The role of CHX10 in the development of the mammalian retina (2002)
- Doctoral advisor: Jane Sowden
- Website: www.adamrutherford.com

Adam David Rutherford (born 16 January 1975) is an English geneticist and science communicator. He was an audio-visual content editor for the journal Nature for a decade, and is a frequent contributor to the newspaper The Guardian. He formerly hosted the BBC Radio 4 programmes Inside Science and (with Hannah Fry) The Curious Cases of Rutherford and Fry; has produced several science documentaries; and has published books related to genetics and the origin of life.

He is Professor of Genetics in Society in the Department of Genetics, Evolution and Environment at University College London.

Rutherford became President of Humanists UK in June 2022, succeeding Alice Roberts.

== Early life and education ==
Adam David Rutherford, who is half-Guyanese Indian, was born in Ipswich in the East of England on 16 January 1975, and was privately educated at Ipswich School.

He was admitted to the medical school at University College London, but transferred to a degree in evolutionary genetics, including a project under Steve Jones studying stalk-eyed flies. He was awarded a PhD in genetics in 2002 by University College London for research completed at the UCL Institute of Child Health at Great Ormond Street Hospital supervised by Jane Sowden. His PhD investigated the role of the gene CHX10 on eye development, with focus on the effect of mutations in this gene on the development of eye disorders.

Rutherford's other academic research was also on genetic causes of eye disorders, including the relation of retinoschisin to retinoschisis, the role of mutations of the gene CRX in retinal dystrophy, and the role of the gene CHX10 in microphthalmia in humans and mice.

== Career ==
Rutherford talks with Francesca Stavrakopoulou, Samira Ahmed and Giles Fraser at Conway Hall in London in 2015.

Rutherford published a book on the topic of the creation of life. The United Kingdom printing has been called "two books in one", since Creation: The Origin of Life and Creation: The Future of Life are printed back-to-back so that one can read the book from either end. Among its topics, the first part of the book argues in support of the theory, first proposed by Thomas Gold, that life emerged not in primordial warm ponds, but in extremophile conditions in the deep ocean, while the second part discusses synthetic biology – the use of genetic modification to create new organisms. In the U.S., this book is published in a more conventional format with the title Creation: How Science Is Reinventing Life Itself. He was also one of the authors whose works are included in the compilation The Atheist's Guide to Christmas.

Rutherford was the Podcast Editor and the audio-video editor for the journal Nature until 2013, being responsible for all the publication's published audio, video, and podcasts. He also published audio interviews with notable personalities, including Paul Bettany on his role playing Charles Darwin in the movie Creation, and David Attenborough in his documentary Charles Darwin and the Tree of Life. He wrote editorials on diverse other topics, ranging from the overlap of art and science to reviews of science-themed movies.

Rutherford is a frequent contributor to The Guardian, writing primarily on science topics. He wrote a blog series covering his thoughts and analysis while re-reading Charles Darwin's On the Origin of Species, and has written articles supporting the teaching of evolution in schools, and criticizing the teaching of creationism as science.

He also writes on religion, notably a 10-part series on his experience participating in the Alpha course, and on New Age themes and alternative medicine, including a review critical of Rupert Sheldrake's A New Science of Life, and criticism of the lack of controls on advertising claims for homeopathy.

As a guest writer, he published an article in Wired on the possibility of using DNA for information storage.

Rutherford has returned to University College London, where he is an honorary senior research associate in the division of biosciences and teaches courses on genetics and communications.

=== Broadcasting ===
Rutherford frequently appears on BBC science programmes, on both radio and television. Since 2013, he has been the host of the programme Inside Science on BBC Radio 4. In 2012 he was featured on the series Horizon on BBC Two television in the documentary Playing God, which covered synthetic biology using the example of the "Spider Goat", a goat genetically modified to produce spider silk in its milk.

In 2011 he presented, on BBC Four, The Gene Code, a two-part series on the implications of the decoding of the human genome, and his documentary, Science Betrayed, detailed the story of the discredited link between the MMR vaccine and autism. In 2010, The Cell, his three-part series on the discovery of cells and the development of cell biology, presented on BBC Four, was included in The Daily Telegraph's list of "10 classic science programmes". In 2006, Discovery Science produced the six-episode TV series Men in White, in which three scientists, Rutherford, Basil Singer and Jem Stansfield, applied science to the solution of everyday problems.

He also appeared in BBC Radio 4's The Infinite Monkey Cage, with physicist Brian Cox, physician and science writer Ben Goldacre, author Simon Singh, musician Tim Minchin, and comedians Helen Arney and Robin Ince, and with The Infinite Monkey Cage Tour, the live show based on the programme. Rutherford is a frequent guest on the Little Atoms radio chat show, and he has also acted as a science advisor on programmes such as The Cat in the Hat Knows a Lot About That!, and the film World War Z.

In 2011 he conceived and directed Space Shuttles United, a video and musical tribute to all the Space Shuttle missions.

He co-presented The Curious Cases of Rutherford & Fry with mathematician Hannah Fry. In 2023 the programme aired its 21st series on BBC Radio 4. In October 2024 the series returned as Curious Cases, still with Fry but Dara Ó Briain replacing Rutherford as co-presenter.

In late 2022, he presented the series Bad Blood: The Story of Eugenics, on BBC Radio 4. The series is based on his book, Control: The Dark History and Troubling Present of Eugenics.

He is also a regular presenter on BBC Radio 4's Start the Week.

=== Public speaking and outreach ===
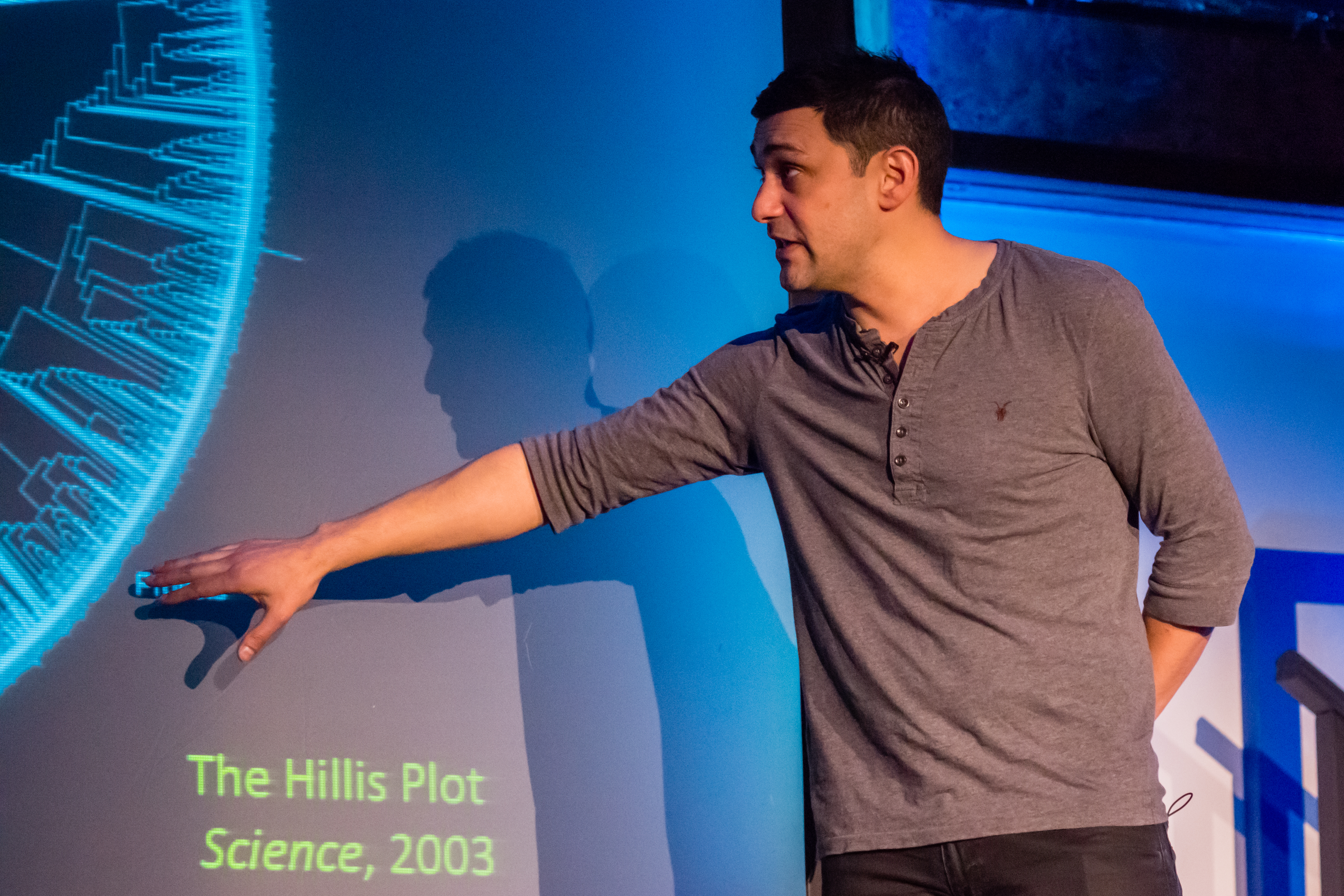
Adam Rutherford speaking at QEDCon 2013, on the Origin and the Future of Life

Rutherford is a frequent speaker at scientific and academic events and a guest at local science and sceptical events, such as Skeptics in the Pub.

In 2013, he was an invited speaker at the QED conference in Manchester, and at the 2013 North East Postgraduate Conference, and delivered the 11th Douglas Adams Memorial Lecture at the Royal Geographical Society in London for Save the Rhino International. In 2012, he delivered the annual Darwin Day Lecture for Humanists UK. In 2019, he delivered the Humanists UK Voltaire Lecture; the lecture formed the basis of his future book How to Argue With a Racist.

Rutherford was a judge and host of the award ceremonies for the 2012 and 2013 Google Science Fairs. In June 2017, he participated in a public discussion with Alan Alda at the University of Dundee, on the occasion of Alda's receiving an honorary degree from that institution. In November 2017, he participated in a debate with Robert Winston on the subject of superhumans at the University of Southampton. He is also critical of 23andMe, describing it as an "empty promise" to find out where you "came from"

== Personal life ==
Rutherford is a founding member of the Celeriac XI Cricket club.

== Bibliography ==
- Creation: The Origin of Life / The Future of Life, Penguin Books (2014), ISBN 9780670920440
- A Brief History of Everyone Who Ever Lived: The Stories in Our Genes, Weidenfeld & Nicolson (2016), ISBN 978-0297609377 – UK edition
- A Brief History of Everyone Who Ever Lived: The Human Story Retold Through Our Genes, The Experiment (2017), ISBN 978-1615194049 – updated US edition
- Genetics (illus. Ruth Palmer), Ladybird Books (2018), ISBN 978-0718188276
- The Book of Humans: The Story of How We Became Us, Weidenfeld & Nicolson (2018), ISBN 978-0297609407
- Humanimal: How Homo sapiens Became Nature’s Most Paradoxical Creature—A New Evolutionary History, The Experiment (2019), ISBN 9781615195312
- How to Argue with a Racist: History, Science, Race and Reality (2020) ISBN 9781474611244
- Rutherford and Fry's Complete Guide to Absolutely Everything (with Hannah Fry) (illus. Alice Roberts) (2021) ISBN 9781787632639
- Control: The Dark History and Troubling Present of Eugenics (2022) ISBN 9781474622387
- Where Are You Really From? (2023) ISBN 9781526364258

== Awards and honours ==
- 2014 Wellcome Book Prize shortlist for Creation: The Origin of Life
- 2017 Wellcome Book Prize longlist for A Brief History of Everyone Who Ever Lived
- 2021 David Attenborough Award and Lecture, Royal Society
- 2024 Royal Society Young People's Book Prize shortlist for Where Are You Really From?
