= Jane Sowden =

British biologist

- Born: Jane Caroline Sowden
- Education: University of Oxford (BA); University College London (PhD)
- Scientific career
- Workplaces: University College London; Great Ormond Street Hospital for Children NHS Foundation Trust
- Thesis: Transcriptional control mechanisms regulating erythroid-specific expression of the carbonic anhydrase I gene (1991)
- Doctoral students: Adam Rutherford
- Website: iris.ucl.ac.uk/iris/browse/profile?upi=JSOWD52

Jane Caroline Sowden is a British biologist who is Professor of Developmental Biology and Genetics at the Great Ormond Street Hospital for Children NHS Foundation Trust. Her research investigates eye formation and repair by developing a better understanding the genetic pathways that regulate eye development.

== Early life and education ==
Sowden was an undergraduate in biochemistry at the University of Oxford. She moved to University College London for her doctorate, where she studied the carbonic anhydrase I gene.

== Research and career ==
After her PhD, Sowden moved to the Medical Research Council (MRC) human biochemical genetics unit. She was awarded a career development award in 1996 and spent four years working on retinal development at the Institute of Ophthalmology. Sowden established the eye development and repair research group at Great Ormond Street Hospital. She looks to understand the genetic pathways that underpin eye development. She is interested in how these pathways are disrupted in patients with eye disease. To explore these pathways, Sowden uses DNA sampling. Childhood blindness can involve structural malformations, which occur due to disruption of biological processes. The eye globe develops before birth from the embryonic optic cup. Mutations of the CHX10 gene can cause non-syndromic microphthalmia. By studying mice with CHX10 mutations Sowden looks to identify the molecular pathways that regulate relevant retinal progenitor cells. These cells undergo a number of cell divisions before producing all retinal neurons. Sowden has explored whether stem cells can be used to repair diseased retinal neurons during retinal diseases such as retinitis pigmentosa. She has explored whether the ciliary epithelium can be used to generate progenitor cells for photoreceptors. She has shown that the developing retina contains a population of rod photoreceptor precursor cells, which can be transplanted into a diseased retina to restore vision.

Her former doctoral students include Adam Rutherford.

=== Selected publications ===
Her publications include:

- Restoration of vision after transplantation of photoreceptors
- Retinal repair by transplantation of photoreceptor precursors
- Fox's in development and disease
- Photoreceptor precursors derived from three-dimensional embryonic stem cell cultures integrate and mature within adult degenerate retina
