= Playing God =

Playing God may refer to:

- Playing God (ethics), a core issue in ethics

== Music ==
- Playing God, a 2012 album from Isgaard
- Playing God (album), a 2016 album by Lang Lee
- "Playing God" (Paramore song), 2009
- "Playing God" (Motionless in White song), 2026
- "Playing God", a song by Bullet for My Valentine from the deluxe edition of the 2015 album Venom

== Film and television ==
- Playing God (1997 film), an American dramatic crime thriller film
- Playing God (2012 film), a documentary film
- Playing God (2021 film), an American film
- Playing God (2024 film), an Italian and French animated short film
- "Playing God" (Star Trek: Deep Space Nine), an episode of Star Trek: Deep Space Nine

== Other uses ==
- Playing God (play), a one-act play by Alan Zweibel
- Playing Gods, a board game making light of religion
