= Curious Cases =

BBC Radio 4 science programme

- Other names: The Curious Cases of Rutherford and Fry
- Running time: ~28 minutes (originally ~14 minutes)
- Home station: BBC Radio 4
- Hosted by: Hannah Fry and Dara Ó Briain
- Original release: 15 February 2016
- No. of episodes: 167 (As of 10 July 2025)
- Website: Curious Cases at BBC Online

Curious Cases is a BBC Radio 4 science programme, presented by Hannah Fry and Dara Ó Briain. Each episode tackles a question sent in by a listener (who are collectively known as The Curios), which they attempt to solve "using the power of science". Currently in its 24th series, it is broadcast weekly on Saturdays.

Originally called "The Curious Cases of Rutherford and Fry", the first 21 series were presented by Adam Rutherford and Hannah Fry, with the first episode airing on Monday, 15 February 2016. After the end of the 21st series, there was a break of just over 19 months. The first episode of series 22 was broadcast on 4 October 2024 with Ó Briain replacing Rutherford.

== Presenters ==
- Hannah Fry has co-hosted the series since its inception to the present. Fry was appointed the Professor of the Public Understanding of Mathematics at the University of Cambridge, UK on 1 January 2025. She was awarded the David Attenborough Award by the Royal Society in 2024.
- Adam Rutherford is a geneticist, writer and author and lecturer at University College London. He was awarded the David Attenborough Award by the Royal Society in 2021., and appointed President of Humanists UK in 2022.
- Dara Ó Briain took over from Rutherford from series 22. He is a comedian and television presenter, and was nominated for a BAFTA TV Award for Best Entertainment Performance in 2012.

== Regular Contributors ==
- Jim Al-Khalili
- Helen Czerski
- Mark Miodownik
- Andrew Ponzen
- Sophie Scott
- Andrea Sella

== Producers ==
- Michelle Martin - series 1-15, 17
- Jen Whyntie - series 16-18
- Fiona Roberts - series 17, 18
- Pamela Rutherford - series 18
- Ilan Goodman - series 19 onwards
- Marijke Peters - series 23, ep 2, 6, 7, 9, 13

== Episodes ==
As well as being broadcast live on BBC Radio 4, episodes are available as podcasts from BBC Sounds. The broadcast episodes are 12.5 minutes long (series 1-15), and 28 minutes long (series 16 onwards). The podcasts include extra material, and so are slightly longer.

There have been a number of special programmes outside the normal series, including 2 short ASMR episodes in February 2020 and a 4-part special mini-series on "Living with AI" in December 2021.
