= Hannah Fry =

English mathematician, author and broadcaster (born 1984)

Hannah Fry HonFREng FIMA FIET
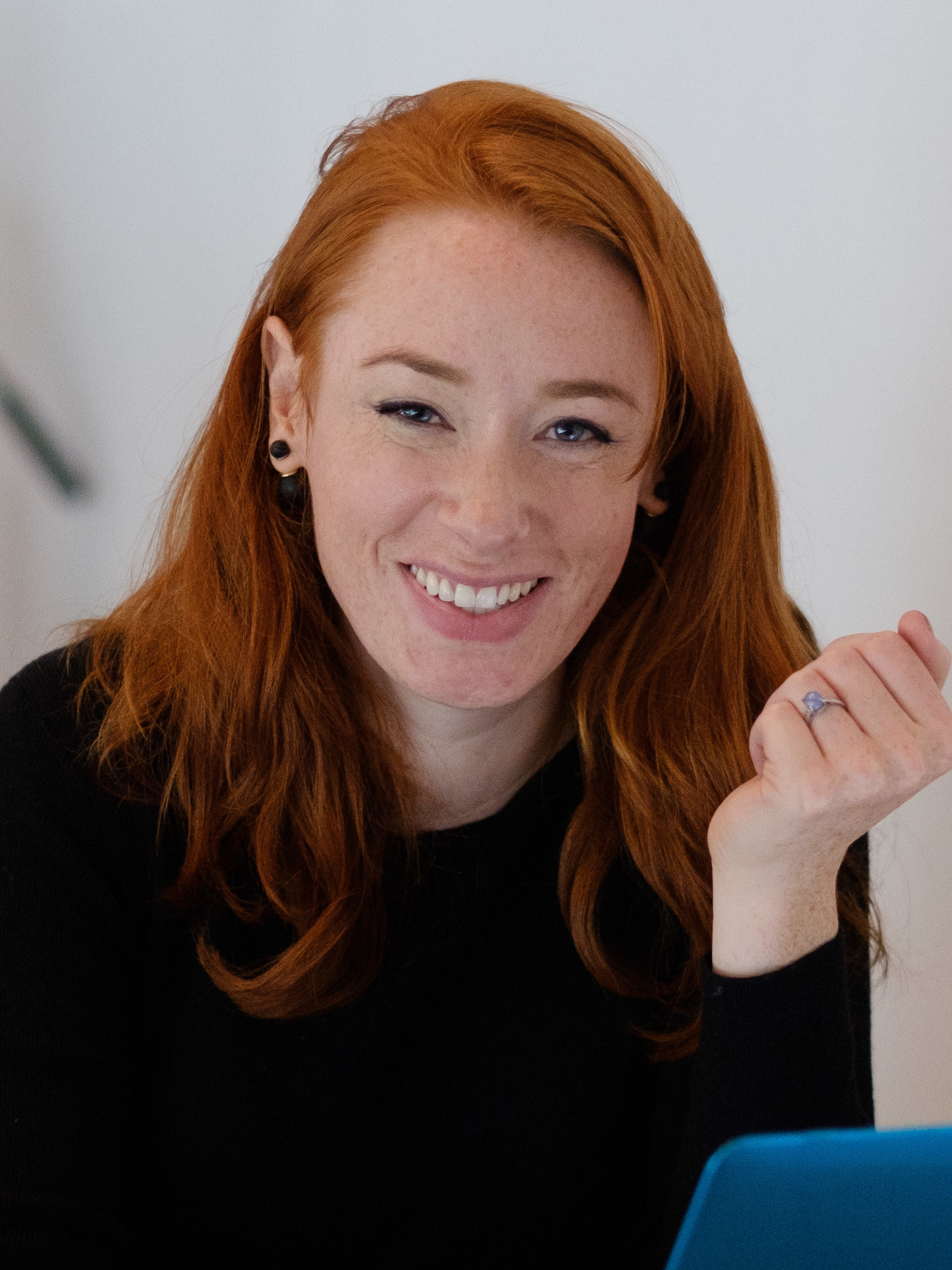
- Fry in 2017
- Born: Hannah Mary Fry; 21 February 1984 (age 42); Harlow, Essex, England
- Education: Presdales School; University College London (BA, MA, PhD)
- Occupations: Mathematician, author, broadcaster
- Children: 2
- Awards: Christopher Zeeman Medal (2018); David Attenborough Award (2024); Leelavati Award (2026)
- Scientific career
- Workplaces: University of Cambridge; University College London
- Thesis: A Study of Droplet Deformation (2011)
- Doctoral advisor: Frank T. Smith
- Website: hannahfry.co.uk

Hannah Mary Fry (born 21 February 1984) is an English mathematician, author and broadcaster. She is the first Professor of the Public Understanding of Mathematics at the University of Cambridge, and a fellow of Queens' College, Cambridge. She was previously the president of the Institute of Mathematics and its Applications and was a professor of the mathematics of cities at University College London.

Her work has included studies of patterns of human behaviour, the mathematics behind pandemics, and scientific explanations of modern appliances. She has had a particular focus on helping the public to improve their mathematical skills. Fry gave the Royal Institution Christmas Lectures in 2019 and has presented several television and radio programmes for the BBC, including The Secret Genius of Modern Life. She has received several awards for her work in mathematics, including the David Attenborough Award and Leelavati Award.

== Early life and education ==
Hannah Mary Fry was born in Harlow, Essex, England, on 21 February 1984. The middle of three sisters, she grew up in Hoddesdon and Ware, Hertfordshire. She is of English and Irish heritage: her father was an English factory worker making hydraulic lifts for lorries and her Irish Catholic mother stayed at home. One summer when she was around 11, her mother made her solve a page of problems in a mathematics textbook each day of the holiday, putting her ahead of other pupils when she went back to school.

She attended Presdales School in Ware, where a teacher inspired her to study mathematics. She graduated from University College London (UCL) with a degree in mathematics. In 2011, she completed her thesis under the supervision of Frank T. Smith and was awarded a PhD from UCL for research on fluid dynamics and the Navier–Stokes equations.

== Career and research ==
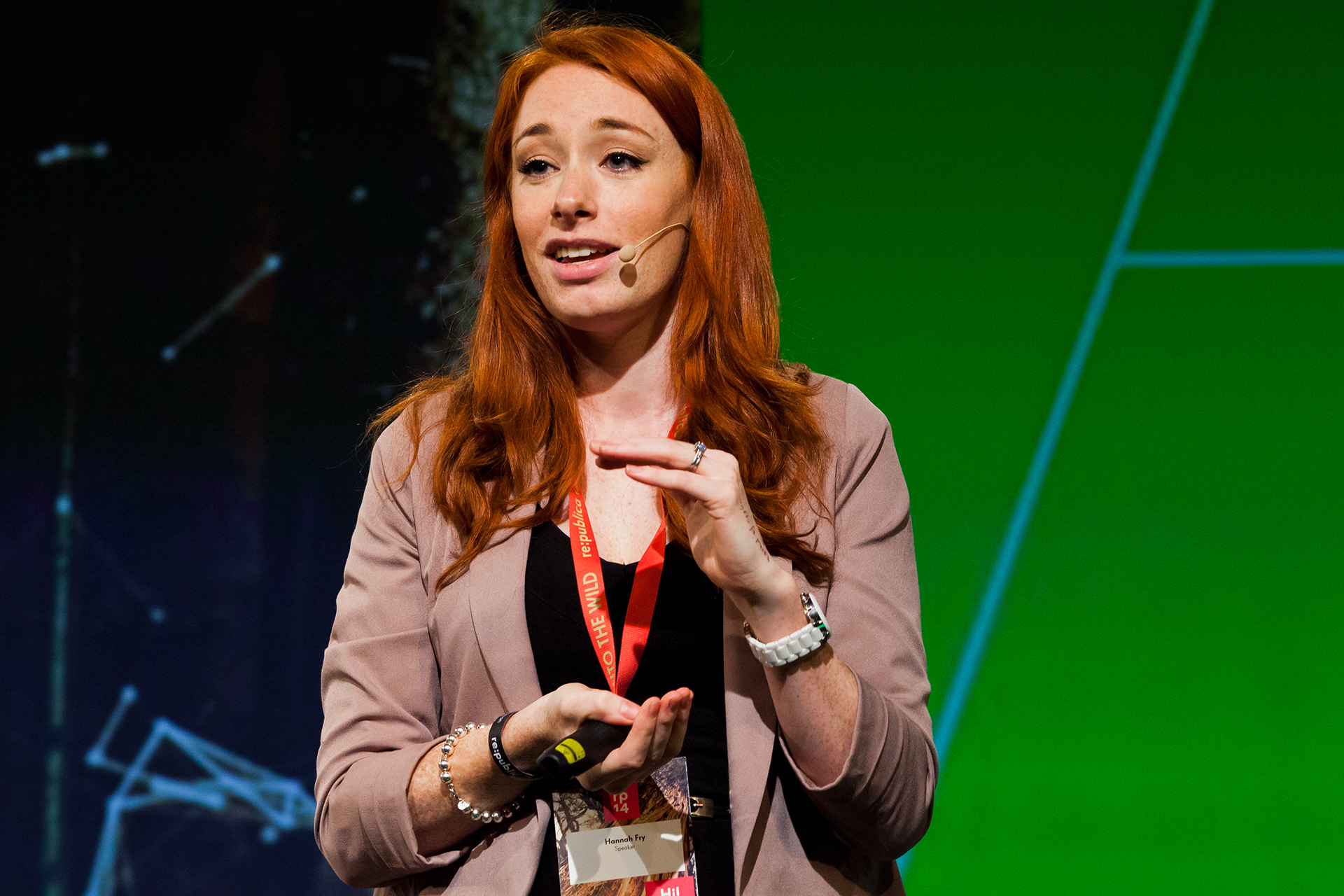
Fry at the re:publica conference in 2014

Fry was appointed as a lecturer at University College London in 2012, working at the UCL Centre for Advanced Spatial Analysis. She was later appointed senior lecturer, then professor in the Mathematics of Cities. In September 2022, she was elected a Fellow of the Royal Academy of Engineering. In 2024, she became president of the Institute of Mathematics and its Applications. She joined the Faculty of Mathematics at the University of Cambridge in January 2025 as the university's first Professor of the Public Understanding of Mathematics.

Fry has attempted to overturn the stereotype that mathematics is "boring" and not worth studying. Although she acknowledges the subject is difficult, she believes it is possible to frame it in a manner that people can identify with.

=== Radio and television ===
Fry began performing stand-up comedy in 2015, leading to a TED Talk and television work. Since then, she has regularly appeared on mainstream media in the UK. In 2016 she presented a BBC Four film biography of computing pioneer Ada Lovelace, and began to co-present Curious Cases on BBC Radio 4. The following year, she co-presented Trainspotting Live with Peter Snow, a three-part series about trains and trainspotting, for BBC Four. In the BBC Two series City in the Sky Fry studied the logistics of aviation. She hosted The Joy of Data on BBC Four, which examines the history and human impact of data. A further credit for 2016 was her co-hosting an episode of the BBC Two Horizon series with Xand van Tulleken, titled How to Find Love Online.

In 2018, Fry presented Contagion! The BBC Four Pandemic, about the possible impact of a flu pandemic, in which she said "we are about to simulate the outbreak of a fatal contagion throughout the UK ... if I can succeed this will save lives when, not if, a real pandemic hits." The programme used Haslemere, Surrey, as the site of the first simulated infection, and coincidentally in February 2020 the town saw the first recorded case of a person contracting COVID-19 from within the UK. She later hosted a one-off 90-minute special of the BBC science programme Tomorrow's World alongside four of the show's previous presenters: Maggie Philbin, Howard Stableford, Judith Hann and Peter Snow.

In 2019, Fry presented a BBC Four programme titled A Day in the Life of Earth which explored how Earth changes in a single day and how these daily changes are essential to human existence. She presented the 2019 edition of the Royal Institution Christmas Lectures, entitled Secrets and lies, on the hidden numbers, rules and patterns that control daily lives, being only the fourth ever mathematician to deliver the lectures. They were broadcast on BBC Four.

Fry co-presented 2020's The Great British Intelligence Test on BBC Two. She has presented further programmes for the BBC explaining the mathematics behind COVID-19 and other pandemics. She was the guest interviewee on The Life Scientific on BBC Radio 4 in 2021, and has appeared on Have I Got News for You.

In July 2022, she presented the BBC Two documentary Unvaccinated, in which she investigated why a portion of the British population remained unvaccinated against COVID-19. Reviewing in The Daily Telegraph, Anita Singh described the show as patronising, commenting that Fry's attempt to explain statistics using "jelly-bean roulette" treated the unvaccinated people who chose to appear in the show like "six-year-olds". Jack Seale for The Guardian wrote that "Fry needs some reward for ... a documentary that requires a near-saintly level of tolerance just to watch, never mind present".

Fry began a six-part series in 2022 on BBC Two, The Secret Genius Of Modern Life, in which she investigates topics such as how credit cards came into being, their manufacture and how they work, and potential future developments. The BBC commissioned a second six-part series, again presented by Fry and first broadcast in November 2023. One episode showed secrets of producing the British passport, including a factory where they are produced, and criticised electronic gates at airports. She presented multiple episodes of The Future With Hannah Fry on Bloomberg Originals, beginning in March 2023. Later that year, Radio 4 started to broadcast Uncharted with Hannah Fry, a series of 15 minute documentaries about graphs.

Fry acted as the 'chief number cruncher' for Channel 4's coverage of the 2024 United Kingdom general election, analysing results data as it came in overnight. She correctly predicted the Labour Party would win, but cautioned the party that they should "dampen their expectations".

Fry has a YouTube channel with over 100 million views, and hosts the podcast The Rest Is Science with Michael Stevens (Vsauce), that started in November 2025. The same month, she presented The Infinite Explorer, a six-part National Geographic documentary series. The following year, she presented a three-part documentary series AI Confidential with Hannah Fry.

In October 2026 Fry appeared in the second series of The Celebrity Traitors. In the third episode of the series, Fry accepted an offer to be recruited by the Traitors, following Richard E. Grant's banishment from the castle. In the fifth episode of the series, she was identified as a traitor and was banished.

In November 2026 she was interviewed by Lauren Laverne on Desert Island Discs. Fry's song choices included "Fans" by Kings of Leon, "Let's Get Ready to Rhumble" by PJ & Duncan and "Monster" by Nicki Minaj and Kanye West.

=== Publications ===
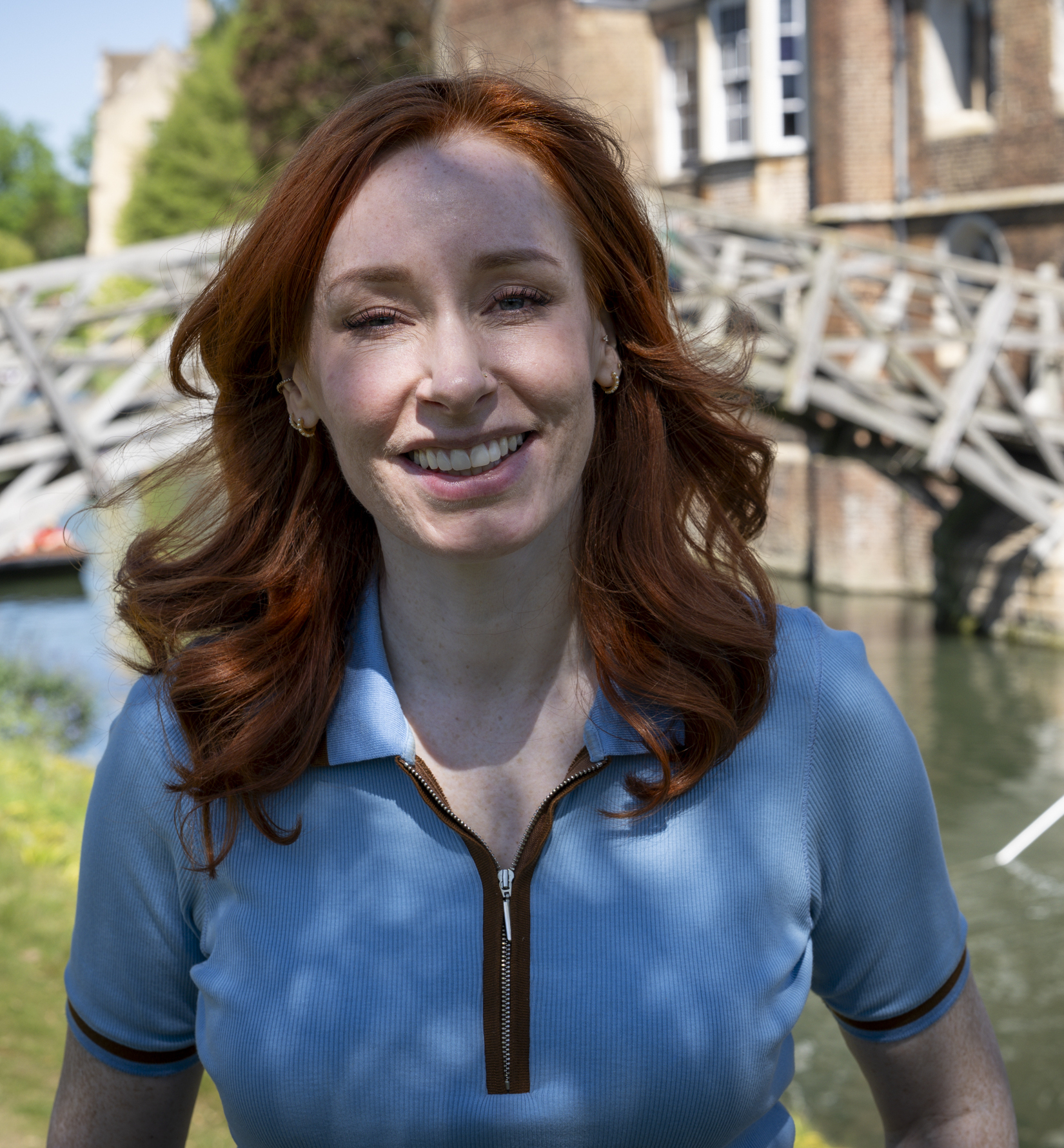
Fry in 2026

Fry has authored or co-authored four books. The first, The Mathematics of Love: Patterns, Proofs, and the Search for the Ultimate Equation (2015), includes the "37% rule", a form of the secretary problem according to which roughly the first third of any potential partners should be rejected. The second, The Indisputable Existence of Santa Claus (2015), discusses various Christmas-related topics and how mathematics can be involved in them, including a fair Secret Santa, decoration of Christmas trees, winning at Monopoly, and comparing the vocabulary of the Queen's Christmas message to that of the lyrics of Snoop Dogg. Her third book is Hello World: How to be Human in the Age of the Machine (2018), which looks at the impact of algorithms that affect lives. In 2021, she co-wrote Rutherford & Fry's Complete Guide to Absolutely Everything (Abridged) with Adam Rutherford. Fry's book No One Knows What They're Doing: The Power of Doubt in an Overconfident World is set to be released on 16 September 2027.

== Awards and honours ==
- 2018: Christopher Zeeman Medal from the Institute of Mathematics and its Applications (IMA) and the London Mathematical Society "for her contributions to the public understanding of the mathematical sciences"
- 2020: Asimov Prize , a literary-scientific award organised by the Istituto Nazionale di Fisica Nucleare and Gran Sasso Science Institute graduate school in Italy, for Hello World
- 2020: Honorary Fellowship of the Institution of Engineering and Technology (IET) on the 150th anniversary of the institution
- 2022: Honorary Fellowship of the Royal Academy of Engineering
- 2023: Honorary Fellowship of the Learned Society of Wales
- 2024: David Attenborough Award by the Royal Society for her "prolific science communication activity as the foremost populariser of maths in the country who continues to inspire young people to pursue maths and physics in fun and exciting ways"
- 2026: TIME Creators 100 List – named as one of the TIME top 100 creators – a list of influential digital voices
- 2026: Leelavati Award, awarded by the International Mathematical Union

== Personal life ==
Fry lives in Greenwich, South London. She co-parents two daughters with her ex-husband. She has the quantum computer prop from the television series Devs and uses it as a chandelier in her home.

In 2020, she was diagnosed with cervical cancer and underwent a radical hysterectomy. She wrote and presented the documentary Making Sense of Cancer with Hannah Fry for BBC Two's Horizon about her treatment and its long-term effects (which included lymphoedema, a chronic swelling condition). The film explores the statistics around disease screening and decision-making by patients and doctors. Fry subsequently had lymphaticovenular anastomosis, a reconstructive surgery. She later wrote of the cancer treatment "we took a very risk-averse route that we didn't need to", and that she regretted she could not have a third child.
