= Hello World: How to be Human in the Age of the Machine =

2018 nonfiction book by Hannah Fry

Hello World: How to Be Human in the Age of the Machine
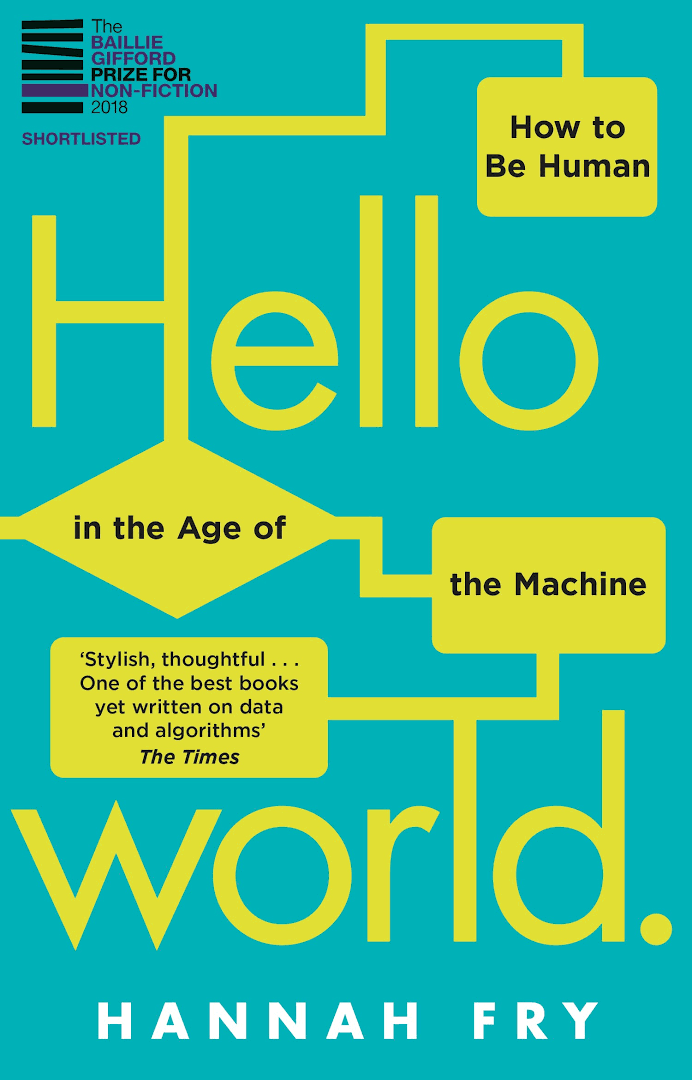
- Author: Hannah Fry
- Original title: Hello World: How to Be Human in the Age of Machine
- Translator: Sigrid Schmid
- Language: English
- Subject: Algorithms, artificial intelligence, technology and society
- Genre: Nonfiction, popular science
- Publisher: Transworld Publishers (UK), Black Swan (imprint)
- Publication date: 6 September 2018
- Publication place: United Kingdom
- Media type: Print (hardcover and paperback), eBook, audiobook
- Pages: 320
- ISBN: 9781784163068

Hello World: How to Be Human in the Age of the Machine (also titled Hello World: Being Human in the Age of Algorithms) is a book on the growing influence of algorithms and artificial intelligence (AI) on human life, authored by mathematician and science communicator Hannah Fry. The book examines how algorithms are increasingly shaping decisions in critical areas such as healthcare, transportation, justice, finance, and the arts.

== Overview ==
Fry uses real-world examples, such as driverless cars and predictive policing, to illustrate her points. She emphasizes that algorithms are not inherently objective; they reflect biases embedded in their design and data inputs. While acknowledging their potential to improve efficiency and accuracy, Fry cautions against over-reliance on machines without human judgment.

Fry explores moral questions surrounding algorithmic decision-making, such as whether machines can replace human empathy in critical situations. She advocates for greater scrutiny of algorithms to ensure fairness and avoid harmful biases. The book proposes a "cyborg future", where humans work alongside algorithms to enhance decision-making while retaining ultimate control.

== Reception ==
Hello World has been praised for its clarity, engaging storytelling, and balanced perspective. Critics have highlighted Fry's ability to make complex topics accessible to general audiences while raising important questions about technology's impact on society.

The book was shortlisted for awards such as the 2018 Baillie Gifford Prize and the Royal Society Science Book Prize.
