= Spidroin =

Protein found in spider silk

Spidroin, N-terminal

Identifiers
- Symbol: Spidroin_N
- Pfam: PF16763
- InterPro: IPR031913
- CATH: 2lpj
Available protein structures:
- PDB: IPR031913 PF16763 (ECOD; PDBsum)
- AlphaFold: IPR031913; PF16763

Spidroin, C-terminal

Identifiers
- Symbol: Spidroin_MaSp
- Pfam: PF11260
- InterPro: IPR021001
- CATH: 2m0m
Available protein structures:
- PDB: IPR021001 PF11260 (ECOD; PDBsum)
- AlphaFold: IPR021001; PF11260

Spidroin-1

Identifiers
- Organism: Trichonephila clavipes
- Symbol: ?
- Orthologs: OMA: entry
- UniProt: P19837
Search for
- Structures: Swiss-model
- Domains: InterPro

Spidroin-2

Identifiers
- Organism: Trichonephila clavipes
- Symbol: ?
- Orthologs: OMA: entry
- UniProt: P46804
Search for
- Structures: Swiss-model
- Domains: InterPro

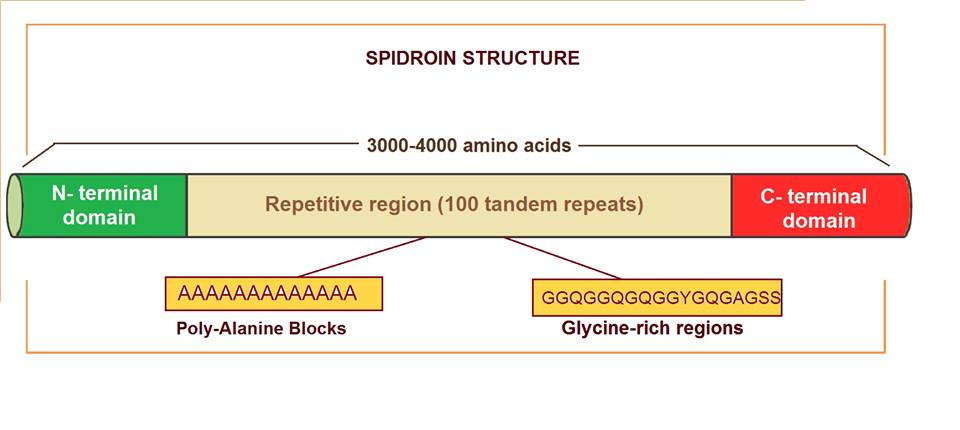
A diagram of the structure of spidroin

Spidroins are the main proteins in spider silk. Different types of spider silk contain different spidroins, all of which are members of a single protein family. The most-researched type of spidroins are the major ampullate silk proteins (MaSp) used in the construction of dragline silk, the strongest type of spider silk. Dragline silk fiber was originally thought to be made up of two types of spidroins, spidroin-1 (MaSp1) and spidroin-2 (MaSp2). However, recent transcriptomic analysis of over 1000 spider species has revealed multiple spidroins are expressed making it much more complex.

Spidroin is part of a large group of proteins called scleroproteins. This group includes other insoluble structural proteins such as collagen and keratin.

A fiber of dragline spidroin is as thick and resistant as one of steel but is more flexible. It can be stretched to approximately 135% of its original length without breaking. Its properties make it an excellent candidate for use in various scientific fields.

== Structure ==
Major ampullate spidroins are large proteins with an extension of 250-350 kDa, with an average of 3500 amino acids. They represent a polymeric organization, mostly based on highly homogenized tandem repeats. There are 100 tandem copies of 30 to 40 amino acids which repeat sequence and they represent more than 90% of the protein sequence. Alanine and glycine residues are the most abundant amino acids in these proteins. Alanine appears in blocks of six to fourteen units that form β-sheets. These alanine blocks can stack to create crystalline structures in the fiber, linking different protein molecules together. Glycine is present in different motifs, such as GGX and GPGXX (where X = A, L, Q, or Y), that also have specific secondary structures (3_{10}-helix and β-spiral, respectively). Glycine-rich regions are more amorphous and contribute to extensibility and flexibility. Some of the differences observed between spidroin 1 and spidroin 2 (the most important major ampullate spidroins) are the proline content, which is very low in the first one but significant in the second one, and the motifs. Motif (GGX)n is characteristic in spidroin 1, while GPG and QQ are typical in spidroin 2.

On the other hand, spidroins have non-repetitive amino (N) and carboxyl (C) terminal domains of approximately 150 and 100 amino acids respectively. N- and C-terminal domains share little resemblance, except that they are both rich in serine and both are largely amphipathic α-helical secondary structures. These domains are conserved not only between spidroin 1 and 2, but also among many silk types and spider species. Experimental data show the N- and C-terminal domains contribute to fiber assembly. The C-terminal domain is involved in the organized transition from a soluble spidroin solution to an insoluble fiber during spinning. It often forms a two-step, clamp-like fold that is highly conserved across species. In the N-terminal domain, there are signal peptides which regulate spidroin secretion from silk gland cells.

Repeat spidroin domains within the spider ampullate gland self assemble by a pH gradient in the spider's duct. As solution pH approaches the protein's isoelectric point, the proteins assemble due to diminished repulsive forces and neutralized surface charges.

== Function ==
An individual spider spins a multitude of silk types, with each type emerging from its own distinctive set of abdominal silk glands. This complex silk machinery enables spiders to use task-specific silks (e.g., for web assembly, egg-case construction, prey wrapping, etc.). The different types of silk (major ampullate silk, minor ampullate silk, flagelliform silk, aciniform silk, tubiliform silk, pyriform silk, and aggregate silk) are composed of different types of proteins.

Dragline silk is mainly formed by spidroin proteins. It is a type of major ampullate silk and is produced in the major ampullate gland. Dragline silk is used not only to construct the outer frame and radii of the orb-shaped web but also as a hanging lifeline that allows the spider to evade and/or escape from predators. The major ampullate gland that produces this silk is formed by three main sections: a central bag (B zone) flanked by a tail (A zone) and a duct heading towards the exit. The tail secretes most of the "spinning dope", a solution which contains the protein molecules that will constitute the silk fiber. The sac is the main storage repository.

The epithelium of the A zone is composed of tall columns of secretory cells of a single type, packed with secretory granules. The major component of these cells which secrete the fibroin solution is a 275kDa protein containing the polypeptides spidroin I and spidroin II. The output of these cells is an aqueous and highly viscous solution of about 50% protein (mostly spidroin). The product secreted makes up the dragline silk, the main structure.

This highly viscous protein emulsion flows into the B zone, where it is covered by glycoproteins. After exiting this bag, the liquid is funneled into the narrow duct. As the gelatinous protein solution moves into the duct, the integral spidroins and glycoproteins are gradually distorted into long, thin, aligned figures with the direction of the flow. Then, they are stretched and lined up in a way that will eventually allow them to create strong intermolecular links. After different processes the silk is extended in the spinning channel to form an extremely tough thread.

== Industrial and biomedical applications ==
In the last decade, much research has been done about spidroin protein and spider silk in order to take advantage of some of its properties, such as its elasticity and strength. Spider silk is used in different industries, and its range of applications in biomedicine is increasing every day. For example, spidroins are being engineered as nanoparticles and hydrogels for localized drug delivery. They also have material applications: the military and defense industries use bulletproof vests made from these fibers.

Recombinant spidroin has been successfully obtained in both eukaryotic and prokaryotic cells although there were some difficulties in the procedure due to the length of the gene sequence. Thanks to expression and the cloning work, it is possible to obtain large-scale production of spidroin which provides new opportunities for the manufacture of new biomaterials. There have been attempts to generate transgenic tobacco and potato plants that express remarkable amounts of recombinant Trichonephila clavipes dragline proteins.

Furthermore, fibers developed from spidroin are tolerated in vitro, in cell culture, and in vivo, in animals like pigs, as no signs of either inflammatory response nor body reaction were shown to these fibers. These results suggest that they could be used in medicine without risk of biocompatibility issues and thus potentially lead to many new opportunities in tissue engineering and regenerative medicine.

The way spiders produce spidroin in micelles has inspired a method of mass-producing recombinant proteins. By fusing a pH-insensitive, charge-reversed mutant of spidroin N-terminal domain to the proteins to produce, much more soluble proteins can be produced in E. coli.

== Other silk types ==
Tubuliform (egg case) silk strands structural domain

Identifiers
- Symbol: RP1-2
- Pfam: PF12042
- InterPro: IPR021915
- CATH: 2mqa
Available protein structures:
- PDB: IPR021915 PF12042 (ECOD; PDBsum)
- AlphaFold: IPR021915; PF12042

Silk proteins present in other spider silk types are also occasionally referred to as spidroin. These include tubuliform silk protein (TuSP), flagelliform silk protein (Flag; O44358-Q9NHW4-O44359), minor ampullate silk proteins (MiSp; K4MTL7), aciniform silk protein (AcSP), pyriform silk protein (PySp) and aggregate silk glue (ASG2/AgSp). These different silk proteins along with MaSP show some level of homology to each other, in protein domains, repeats, and in promoters, but also have their own unique features and variations on these parts to fulfill their different functions. These commonalities point at a common origin of proteins found in all these different types of silks.

== Artificial production ==
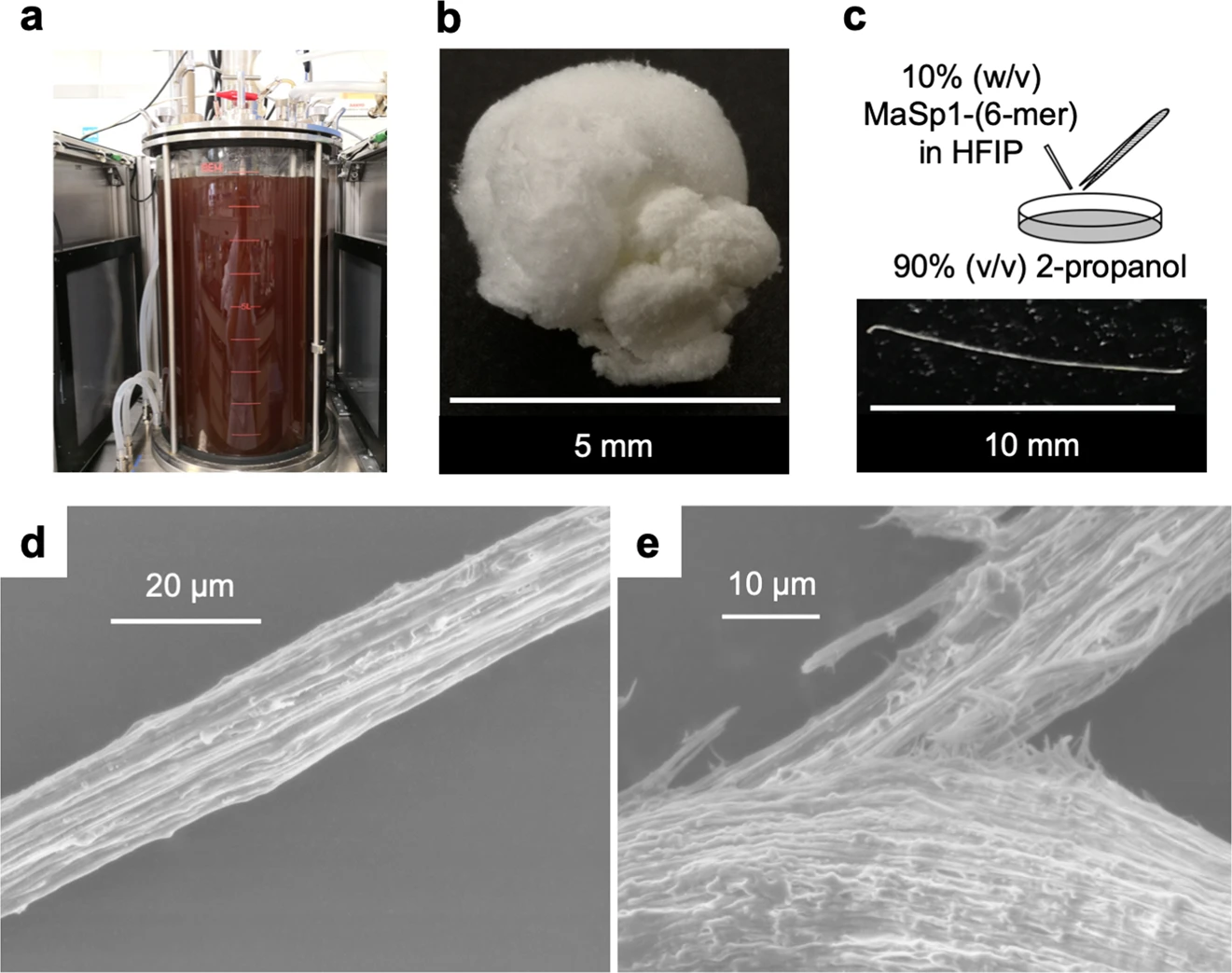

In July 2020 a team of Riken researchers report that they succeeded in using a genetically altered variant of R. sulfidophilum to produce spidroins.

== See also ==
- Biomaterial
- Recombinant protein
- Spider silk
- Fibroin
- Scleroprotein
- BioSteel (fiber)
