= Men in White (TV series) =

Men in White is a TV show starring Adam Rutherford, Basil Singer, and Jem Stansfield. The show revolved around the three scientists who try to solve average, everyday problems.
