= BioSteel (fiber) =

Protein-based fiber

BioSteel was a trademark name for a high-strength fiber-based material made of the recombinant spider silk-like protein extracted from the milk of transgenic goats, made by defunct Montreal-based company Nexia Biotechnologies, and later by the Randy Lewis lab of the University of Wyoming and Utah State University. It is reportedly 7–10 times as strong as steel if compared for the same weight, and can stretch up to 20 times its unaltered size without losing its strength properties. It also has very high resistance to extreme temperatures, not losing any of its properties within −20 to 330 degrees Celsius (−4 to 626 degrees Fahrenheit).

The company had created lines of goats to produce recombinant versions of two spidroins from Nephila clavipes, the golden orb weaver, MaSp1 and MaSp2 When the female goats lactate, the milk, containing the recombinant DNA silk, was to be harvested and subjected to chromatographic techniques to purify the recombinant silk proteins.

The purified silk proteins could be dried, dissolved using solvents (DOPE formation) and transformed into microfibers using wet-spinning fiber production methods. The spun fibers were reported to have tenacities in the range of 2–3 grams/denier and elongation range of 25–45%. The "Biosteel biopolymer" had been transformed into nanofibers and nanomeshes using the electrospinning technique.

Nexia is the only company that has successfully produced fibers from spider silk expressed in goat's milk. The Lewis lab has produced fibers from recombinant spider silk protein and synthetic spider silk proteins and genetic chimeras produced in both recombinant E. coli and the milk of recombinant goats, however, no one has been able to produce the silk in commercial quantities thus far. The company was founded in 1993 by Dr. Jeffrey Turner and Paul Ballard and was sold in 2005 to Pharmathene.

In 2009, two transgenic goats were sold to the Canada Agriculture Museum after Nexia Biotechnologies went bankrupt.

Research has since continued with the help of Randy Lewis, a professor formerly at the University of Wyoming and now at Utah State University. He was also able to successfully breed "spider goats" in order to create artificial silk. As of 2012, there are about 30 of the goats at a university-run farm. The U.S. Navy has plans to turn this silk into a tool for stopping vessels by entangling their propellers.

Potential applications of artificial spider silk biopolymers include using it for the coating of implants and medical products as well as for artificial ligaments and tendons, due to its elastic tendencies and also since it is a natural product which will synthesize well with the body. Other potential uses for artificial silk biopolymers include personal care products and textiles.
