= Rhodovulum =

Scientific classification
- Domain: Bacteria
- Kingdom: Pseudomonadati
- Phylum: Pseudomonadota
- Class: Alphaproteobacteria
- Order: Rhodobacterales
- Family: Rhodobacteraceae
- Genus: Rhodovulum; Hiraishi and Ueda 1994

Species
- Rhodovulum adriaticum (Neutzling et al. 1984) Hiraishi and Ueda 1994; Rhodovulum aestuarii Divyasree et al. 2016; Rhodovulum algae Ramaprasad et al. 2016; Rhodovulum bhavnagarense Srinivas et al. 2012; Rhodovulum euryhalinum (Kompantseva 1989) Hiraishi and Ueda 1994; Rhodovulum imhoffii Srinivas et al. 2007; Rhodovulum iodosum Straub et al. 1999; Rhodovulum kholense Anil Kumar et al. 2008; Rhodovulum lacipunicei Chakravarthy et al. 2009; Rhodovulum mangrovi Nupur et al. 2014; Rhodovulum marinum Srinivas et al. 2006; Rhodovulum phaeolacus Lakshmi et al. 2011; Rhodovulum robiginosum Straub et al. 1999; Rhodovulum salis Srinivas et al. 2014; Rhodovulum steppense Kompantseva et al. 2010; Rhodovulum strictum Hiraishi and Ueda 1995; Rhodovulum sulfidophilum (Hansen and Veldkamp 1973) Hiraishi and Ueda 1994; Rhodovulum tesquicola Kompantseva et al. 2012; Rhodovulum viride Srinivas et al. 2014; Rhodovulum visakhapatnamense Srinivas et al. 2007

Genus of bacteria

Rhodovulum is a genus of bacteria in the family Rhodobacteraceae.
