= A Brief History of Everyone Who Ever Lived =

2016 popular science book by Adam Rutherford

- First UK edition cover
- Author: Adam Rutherford
- Language: English
- Subject: Genetics
- Genre: Popular science
- Publisher: Weidenfeld & Nicolson (UK); The Experiment (US)
- Publication date: 8 September 2016 (UK); 3 October 2017 (US)
- Publication place: United Kingdom
- Media type: Print (hardcover)
- Pages: 432 (UK); 416 (US)
- Awards: Foreword INDIE Gold Award; Thomas Bonner Book Prize
- ISBN: 978-0297609377 (UK); 978-1615194049 (US)

First US edition cover showing a different subtitle

A Brief History of Everyone Who Ever Lived: The Stories in Our Genes (published in the United States as A Brief History of Everyone Who Ever Lived: The Human Story Retold Through Our Genes) is a popular science book by British geneticist, author and broadcaster Adam Rutherford. It was first published in 2016 in the United Kingdom by Weidenfeld & Nicolson. An updated edition (Note: The updated American edition includes a foreword by Indian-American physician and biologist Siddhartha Mukherjee, author of The Gene: An Intimate History (2016), and an extra chapter: "These American lands".) was published in the United States in 2017, with a different subtitle, by The Experiment. The book is about human genetics and what it reveals about human identity and their history.

A Brief History of Everyone Who Ever Lived won gold at the 2017 Foreword INDIE Book Awards for Science, and won the 2018 Thomas Bonner Book Prize. The book was also a 2017 National Book Critics Circle Award non-fiction finalist, featured on the 2017 Wellcome Book Prize longlist, and appeared on National Geographic's top 12 books from 2017.

== Table of contents ==
- Foreword by Siddhartha Mukherjee ^{[*]}
- Introduction
- Part One: How we came to be
1. Horny and mobile
2. The first European union
3. These American lands ^{[*]}
4. When we were kings
  1. The king lives on
  2. Richard III, Act VI
  3. The king is dead ...
- Part Two: Who we are now
5. The end of race
6. The most wonderous map ever produced by humankind
7. Fate
8. A short introduction to the future of humankind
- Epilogue

^{[*]} 2017 US edition

== Synopsis ==
A Brief History of Everyone Who Ever Lived explains the Out of Africa hypothesis that Homo sapiens originated in Africa about 200,000 years ago. They began slowly migrating to Europe around 100,000 years ago, where they encountered Neanderthals. DNA extracted from Neanderthal remains and compared to contemporary human DNA showed that Homo sapiens mated with Homo neanderthalensis. Today, about 2% of the sequence in European genomes is of Neanderthal origin. The book also investigates the lineage of European kings. DNA has enabled geneticists to construct their family trees going back to Charlemagne in the 8th century. Rutherford shows that family trees are not neat and tidy, but tangled webs. They often collapse in on themselves as a result of inbreeding. King Charles II of Spain's family tree was particularly bad as a result of incest in the family. Their rationale for this practice was to preserve their "royal blood", and this often had an adverse effect on their health; Charles himself was disabled, epileptic and mentally unstable.

The book discusses the genes responsible for some human traits, including red hair, earwax and lactose intolerance/lactase persistence. Racial classification is shown to be a scientifically invalid concept. The genome encodes a huge number of characteristics that differ from person to person, which far outnumber the physical differences between black and white people. Rutherford concludes that genetics cannot be used to define race. Francis Galton and his contribution to the development of eugenics is also examined. The Human Genome Project revealed that humans only have about 20,000 genes, far fewer than scientists expected, and ended up posing more questions than it answered. The project also highlighted the limits of genetics and that it is no panacea for diseases. Rutherford criticises the popular press for their inaccurate reporting on genetics, and companies conducting genealogical DNA tests that produce impossibly accurate results. He says these companies and the press often overlook the fact that genetics is not an exact science – it is probabilistic.

Successive migrations of Homo sapiens (red), starting about 200,000 years ago in Africa

== Reception ==
In a review in The Guardian, Colin Grant described A Brief History of Everyone Who Ever Lived as an "effervescent work, brimming with tales and confounding ideas". He called the author "an enthusiastic guide" who disentangles the maze of collapsed family trees and inbreeding. Grant felt that he was "especially illuminating" on the ill-defined notion of race, and "how it both does and doesn't exist". He said that Rutherford aims high: the rewriting human history, but called him "a commendable historian ... who is determined to illuminate the commonality of Homo sapiens".

Robin McKie described Rutherford's exposition of the Human Genome Project as "elegant". Writing in another review of the book in The Guardian, McKie noted how the author is careful to bring the project's "dreams of a medical revolution" down to earth, emphasising that its "greatest achievement ... was working out exactly how little we knew." McKie praised Rutherford for highlighting modern genetics' limitations, that it is better at describing humans as a species than as individuals. He called the book "a polished, thoroughly entertaining history of Homo sapiens", adding that it is "popular science writing at its best".

In a review in The New York Times, Misha Angrist described A Brief History of Everyone Who Ever Lived as "nothing less than a tour de force". Despite the book's ambitious tile, he felt that Rutherford "deliver[s] on its great promise". Angrist complimented the author on his "captivating storytelling" that is "entertaining and engaging" and "never feels pedantic". He was impressed by the way Rutherford dealt with such sensitive topics as race and eugenics, and that he used examples like earwax and lactose intolerance, rather than Mendel's exhumed pea plants to demonstrate how genetics work. Angrist concluded his review by stating: "If genetics can ever offer us words to live by, I reckon these are probably the best it can do."

Nancy R. Curtis wrote in the Library Journal that A Brief History of Everyone Who Ever Lived should attract readers of both popular and technical science books. She said it is "amusing and provocative", and "may bruise the egos of a few genealogists". Curtis did, however, complain that Rutherford gives too much attention to European and British issues, and from time to time "succumbs to editorializing on peripheral topics", for example creationism and genetic determinism. In a review in The Wall Street Journal, Charles C. Mann was a little critical of the book's title, saying that it "is not particularly brief, not exactly a history and not concerned with everyone who ever lived". But he was pleased that Rutherford did not fall into the trap of "hyping the science to sell the story" that popular science books often do. He said the author is "an enthusiastic guide and a good story-teller", although Mann did complain about Rutherford's many digressions that interrupt the flow of the text.

== Awards ==
Award	Year	Result
Wellcome Book Prize	2017	Longlisted
National Book Critics Circle Award	2017	Shortlisted
Foreword INDIE Gold Award for Science	2017	Won
Thomas Bonner Book Prize	2018	Won
