= Royal Society David Attenborough Award and Lecture =

Annual award for public engagement with science

- Awarded for: "outstanding public engagement with science"
- Presented by: the Royal Society
- First award: 2020
- Website: Official website

The Royal Society David Attenborough Award and Lecture is awarded annually by the Royal Society for "outstanding public engagement with science".

The award is named in honour of David Attenborough, a prominent British broadcaster and naturalist, who is an honorary Fellow of the Royal Society.

Recipients receive a silver medal and a prize of £2,500.

The inaugural winner was Alice Roberts in 2020.

== Recipients ==
Recipients of the Royal Society David Attenborough Award and Lecture
Year	Name	Image	Citation	Ref.
2020	Alice Roberts		"For outstanding contributions to public engagement ranging across medicine, anatomy, biology, evolution and archaeology, through lectures, television, books, and other media, as well as her advocacy through her role as Professor of Public Engagement at the University of Birmingham and as the President of the British Science Association."	
2021	Adam Rutherford		"For his contribution to strengthening public confidence in science through radio, TV, films, talks and books, and in particular, for challenging racist pseudoscience."	
2022	Jonathan Van-Tam		"For his critical role in public engagement during the Covid-19 pandemic as UK Deputy Chief Medical Officer, through national and international media."	
2023	Richard Wiseman		"For his sustained and innovative public engagement with the psychology of magic and the nature of deception, and his exposure of pseudo-science through multiple routes including books, videos and festivals."	
2024	Hannah Fry		"For her prolific science communication activity as the foremost populariser of maths in the country who continues to inspire young people to pursue maths and physics in fun and exciting ways."	
2025	Roger Highfield		"For a vast contribution to public engagement, reaching audiences of millions as a journalist, broadcaster, author, and through museum-led initiatives."	
