= Planet Mechanics =

British documentary television series

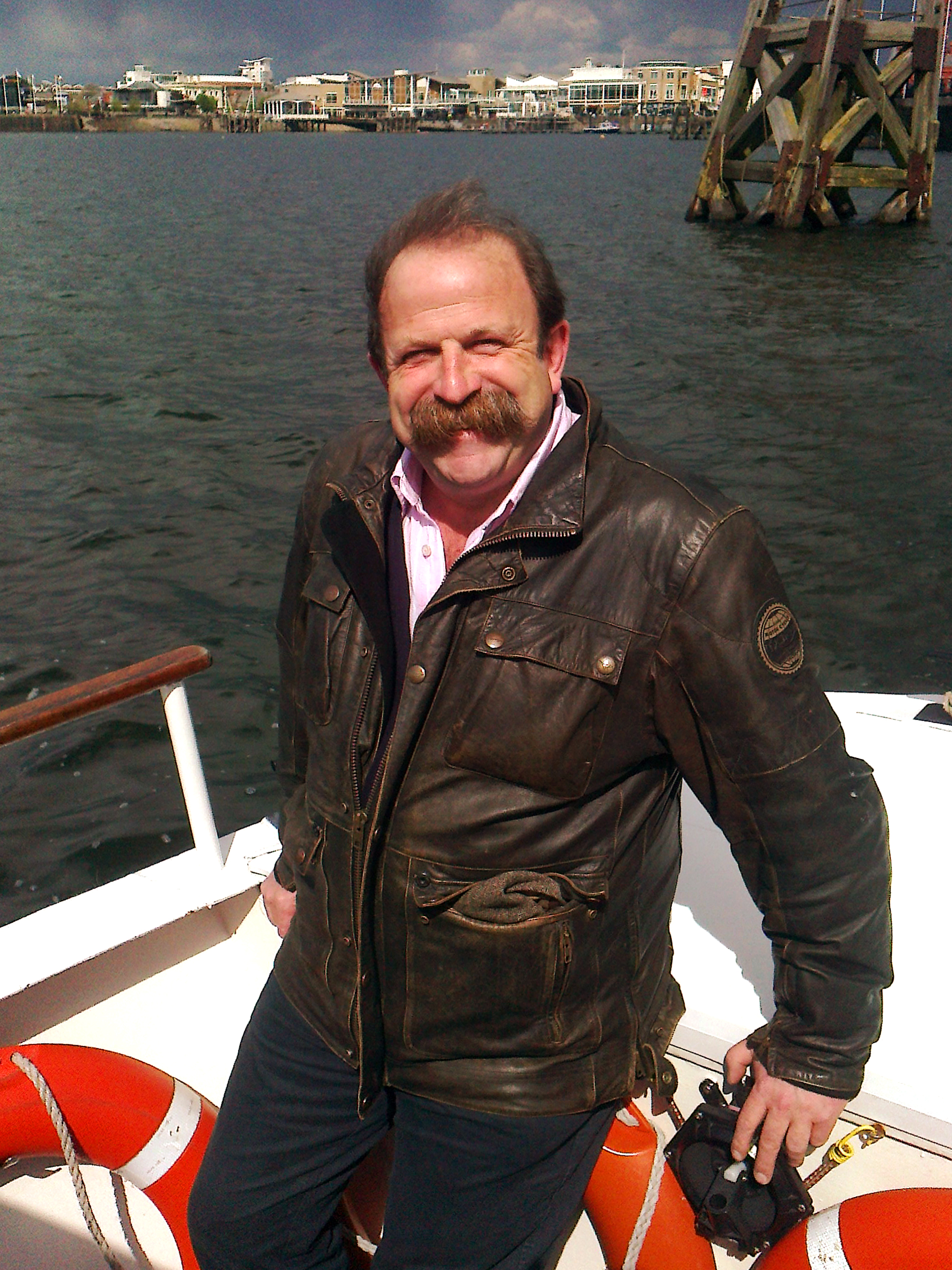
- Genre: Documentary
- Created by: National Geographic UK
- Starring: Dick Strawbridge; Jem Stansfield
- Narrated by: Adam Longworth
- Country of origin: United Kingdom
- No. of seasons: 1
- No. of episodes: 8

Production
- Running time: 45–50 Minutes

Original release
- Network: National Geographic Channel
- Release: 6 April – 25 May 2008

Planet Mechanics is a British TV program shown on the National Geographic Channel in 2008. The show has ended after the first series.

== Background ==
Planet Mechanics sees two engineers, Dick Strawbridge and Jem Stansfield, travelling in an eco-friendly workshop, previously a horse trailer, to fix the planet's most pressing environmental problems.

== Episodes ==
No.	Title	Directed by	Original release date
1	"Air-Propelled Sandwich"	Helen Williamson	6 April 2008
Travelling to Bath, England, Dick and Jem meet up with an eco-minded sandwich shop owner eager to create an environmentally friendly delivery vehicle. Riding around town on a tandem bike, Dick and Jem experience first-hand the challenges of creating a green vehicle able to cope with the hills and cobblestones of Bath. To build a lightweight 'green machine', Dick and Jem will need to make something small and agile – able to accelerate uphill and manoeuvre through traffic. The solution: an air-propelled motorbike.
2	"Cow Power"	Matthew Ainsworth	13 April 2008
Down on the farm in rural England, Dick and Jem must tame a fuel-guzzling monster by turning cow manure into natural gas. Farmer Andy's grain dryer uses 90 litres of gas an hour to dry 10 tonnes of grain. Drinking over 450 kilograms of fuel for one crop, this gas guzzler burns as much fossil fuel in one ten-hour day as a family car might in an entire year. Cashing in on the farm's hefty amount of cow dung, Dick and Jem hatch a plan to harvest the methane found naturally in cow manure. But storing a vast amount of this explosive gas is dangerous and Dick and Jem must work out a solution to keep their latest eco-friendly experiment from blowing up – literally. The pair cuts down an old 2-ton oil tank and submerge it in a custom-built massive water bath to minimise the explosion risk.
3	"Water Wars"	Caius Julyan	20 April 2008
Dick and Jem must make England's most remote youth hostel completely energy self-sufficient. With the only reliable energy source miles away, the pair must use only the natural resources found in the valley to help power this hostel. Setting out with two very different game plans, Dick looks to generate energy from a local stream while Jem searches for enough wind power to create a high-powered wind turbine.
4	"Solar Paella"	Paul O'Connor	27 April 2008
Dick and Jem head to Andalucía in their eco-friendly workshop to help one farmer pump enough water from his well to sustain his cattle. Dick and Jem devise radically different solutions to farmer Jesus' water problem – Dick harnesses wind power using a traditional windpump while Jem pushes his inventive boundaries to the limit with a Stirling engine.
5	"Electric Water Taxi"	Charlie Clare	4 May 2008
Invited by former Olympic sailor Alberto Sonino, Dick and Jem travel to Venice, Italy, to help save one of the world's most beautiful cities from the damaging effect of boat pollution. With 40,000 boats commuting around Venice, exhaust from Europe's largest car-free zone mixes with water and creates an acid that is eroding away the historic buildings' precious facades. With a stunning US$30,000 boat provided by Alberto, Dick and Jem get to work on creating an electric-powered motor. To power the engine using a clean power resource, Dick and Jem outfit the water taxi with solar panels that re-charge the motor's batteries.
6	"Surf Power"	Matthew Ainsworth	11 May 2008
Dick and Jem go to County Clare, on the west coast of Ireland in an attempt to harness the power of the ocean waves. It has been calculated that the sea around Ireland could contain enough wave energy to supply over eighteen times the country's entire electrical demand; however, the destructive nature of waves make them a difficult energy source to tap. Taking on the Atlantic Ocean, Dick and Jem want to generate green electricity for Irish surfers Keith and Rosy who tour the coast looking for the best waves in their travel trailer, the 'surf shack'. With a few days and some simple resources, Dick and Jem work with the surfers on a test project that will put the waves to work. Using practical experiments and demonstrations, the Planet Mechanics devise a huge wave energy converter with some surplus sewer pipe and steel and bolt it to a concrete pier.
7	"Heavy Metal House"	Caius Julyan	18 May 2008
The Planet Mechanics travel to Liverpool, England, to try to find a solution to Britain's affordable housing crisis. They have been invited by Professor Kronenburg, Head of Architecture at Liverpool University to help turn cheap and plentiful shipping containers into the economical and sustainable homes of the future. There are enough shipping containers in existence to circle the Earth more than twice if laid end-to-end.
8	"Tree Powered Truck"	Tim Walker	25 May 2008
Dick and Jem come to the aid of an environmentalist organisation, Trees for Cities. They modify a pick-up truck to run on wood gas.
