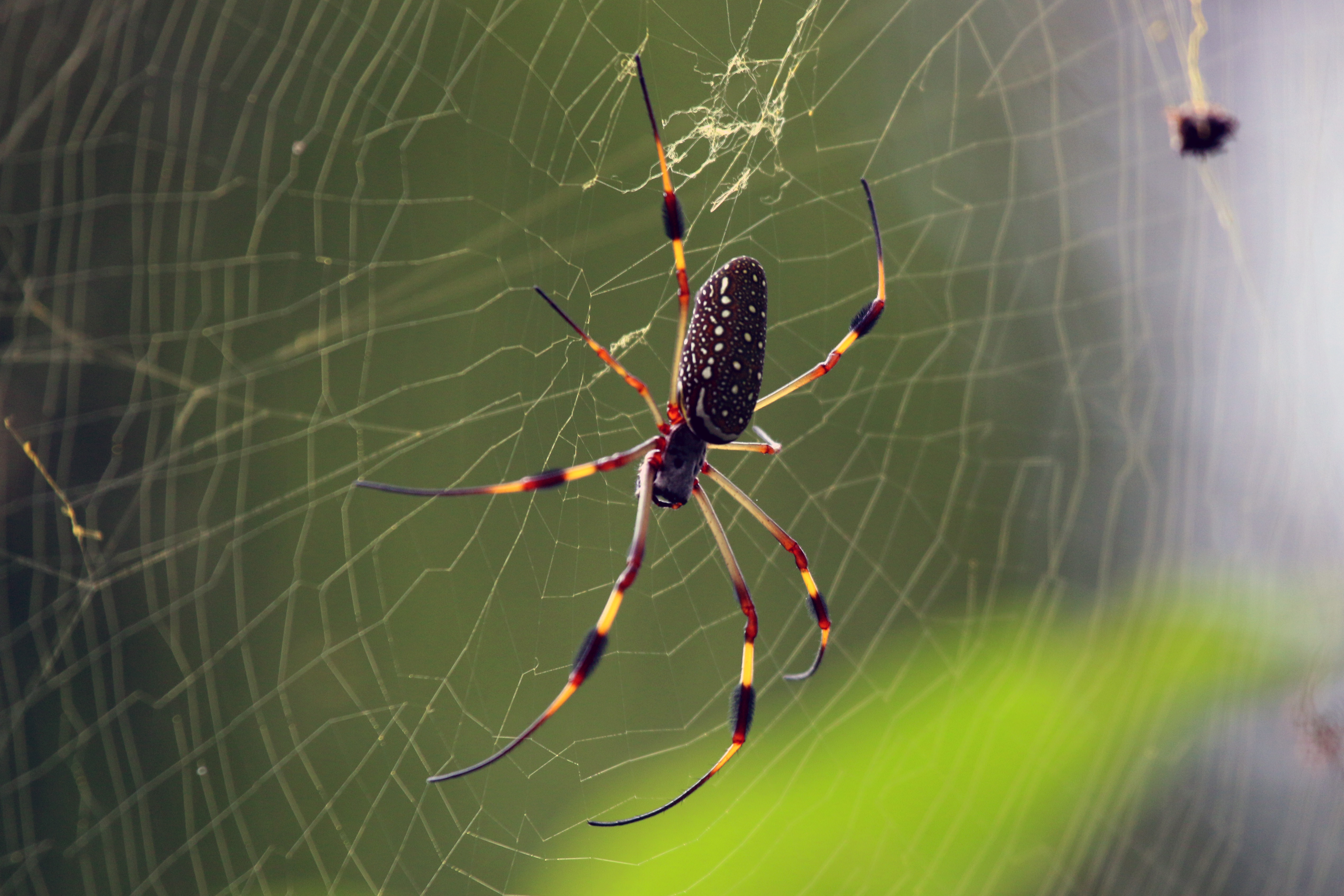
- Female, Jamaica
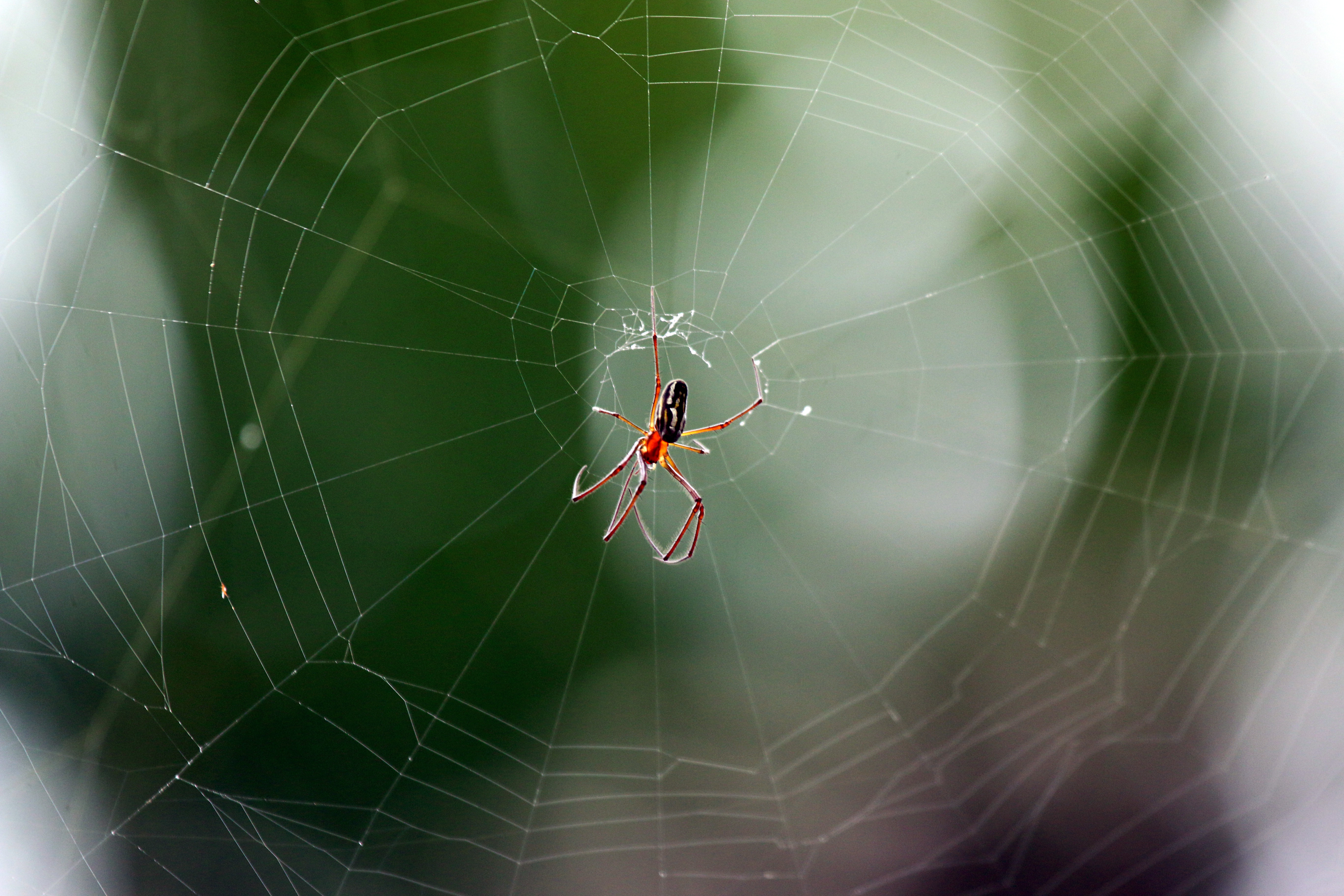
- Male, Jamaica

Conservation status
- Least Concern (IUCN 3.1)

Scientific classification
- Kingdom: Animalia
- Phylum: Arthropoda
- Subphylum: Chelicerata
- Class: Arachnida
- Order: Araneae
- Infraorder: Araneomorphae
- Family: Nephilidae
- Genus: Trichonephila
- Species: T. clavipes

Binomial name
- Trichonephila clavipes (Linnaeus, 1767)

Synonyms
- Aranea clavipes; Aranea spinimobilis; Aranea longimana; Epeira clavipes; Epeira plumipes; Nephila wilderi; Nephila wistariana; Nephila concolor; Nephila thomensis; Nephila clavipes

= Trichonephila clavipes =

Species of spider native to the Americas

Trichonephila clavipes (formerly known as Nephila clavipes), commonly known as the golden silk orb-weaver, golden silk spider, golden orb weaver spider or colloquially banana spider (a name shared with several others), is an orb-weaving spider species which inhabits forests and wooded areas ranging from the southern US to Argentina. It is indigenous to both continental North and South America. Known for the golden color of their silk, the large size of their females, and their distinctive red-brown and yellow coloring, T. clavipes construct large, asymmetrical circular webs attached to trees and low shrubs in woods to catch small- and medium-size flying prey, mostly insects. They are excellent web-builders, producing and utilizing seven different types of silk, and they subdue their prey by injecting them with venom, as opposed to related species which immobilize their prey by wrapping them in silk first. They are not known to be aggressive towards humans, only biting out of self-defense if touched, and their relatively harmless venom has a low toxicity, posing little health concern to healthy human adults. Due to their prevalence in forests, T. clavipes may be encountered by hikers.

Like many orb-weaver species, T. clavipes shows sexual dimorphism, with females possessing both a larger size and more complex and noticeable coloration. Males of the species do not suffer sexual cannibalism or genital mutilation to the same rate that males of other related species in the subfamily Nephilinae do, making T. clavipes a focus of study into the mating behaviors of spiders. The species shows both monogynous and polygynous mating, with a preference for polygyny in most mating environments.

T. clavipes is a well-studied species with a high recognized value to humans because of their usefulness in spider silk research. Analysis of the species' genome, the first of the orb-weaving spiders to be completely annotated, has revealed 28 unique genes for the proteins comprising spider silk, known as spidroins. Furthermore, the silk of T. clavipes has the potential to aid in surgeries involving the nervous system, a capability which has been demonstrated in past experimental studies.

== Description ==
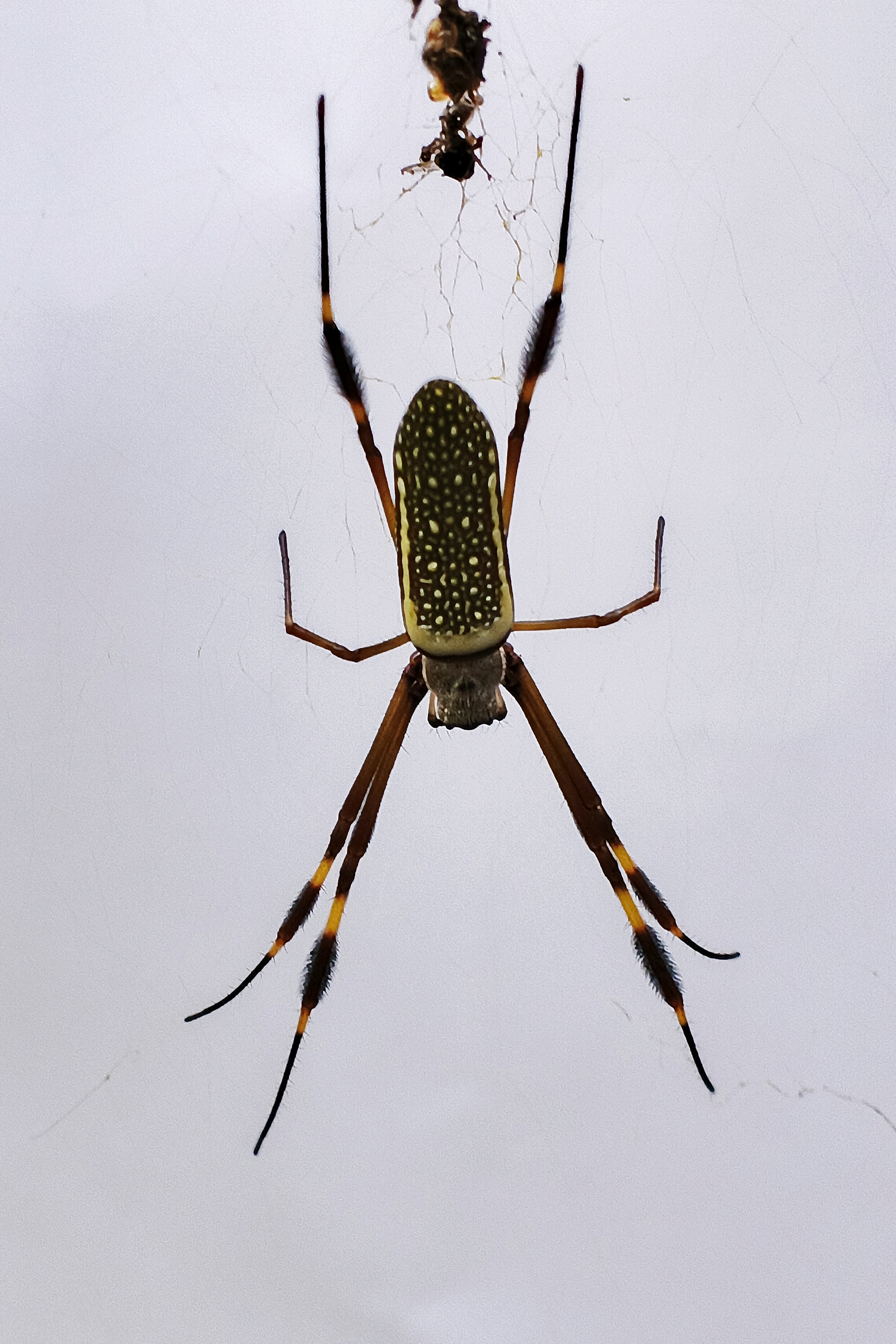
A female Triconephila clavipes on her web

Like most orb-weavers, the species displays marked sexual dimorphism in both size and color pattern. T. clavipes females are some of the largest non-tarantula spiders in North America, ranging from 24 mm to 40 mm in length when fully developed. It is possible that they are even the largest orb-weaver species indigenous to the United States. Females also have very distinct coloring, making the species relatively easy to recognize. They have a silvery white cephalothorax and a longer orange-brown abdomen with two rows of small white-yellow spots. The abdomen changes color as the spider matures. Their legs consist of dark yellow and brown banding, and the first, second, and fourth leg pairs also contain black brush-like tufts of hair near the joints.

Males, meanwhile, are much smaller, about one-third to one-quarter the size of females at roughly 6 mm in length, and also have a more slender build. Their mass is roughly between 1/30th and 1/70th that of a large female. Male coloration, meanwhile, is much less complex, consisting of a dark brown body and legs. Males' legs contain a black band near the end of the tibial segment, in the same area as where the black hair tufts would be on a female.

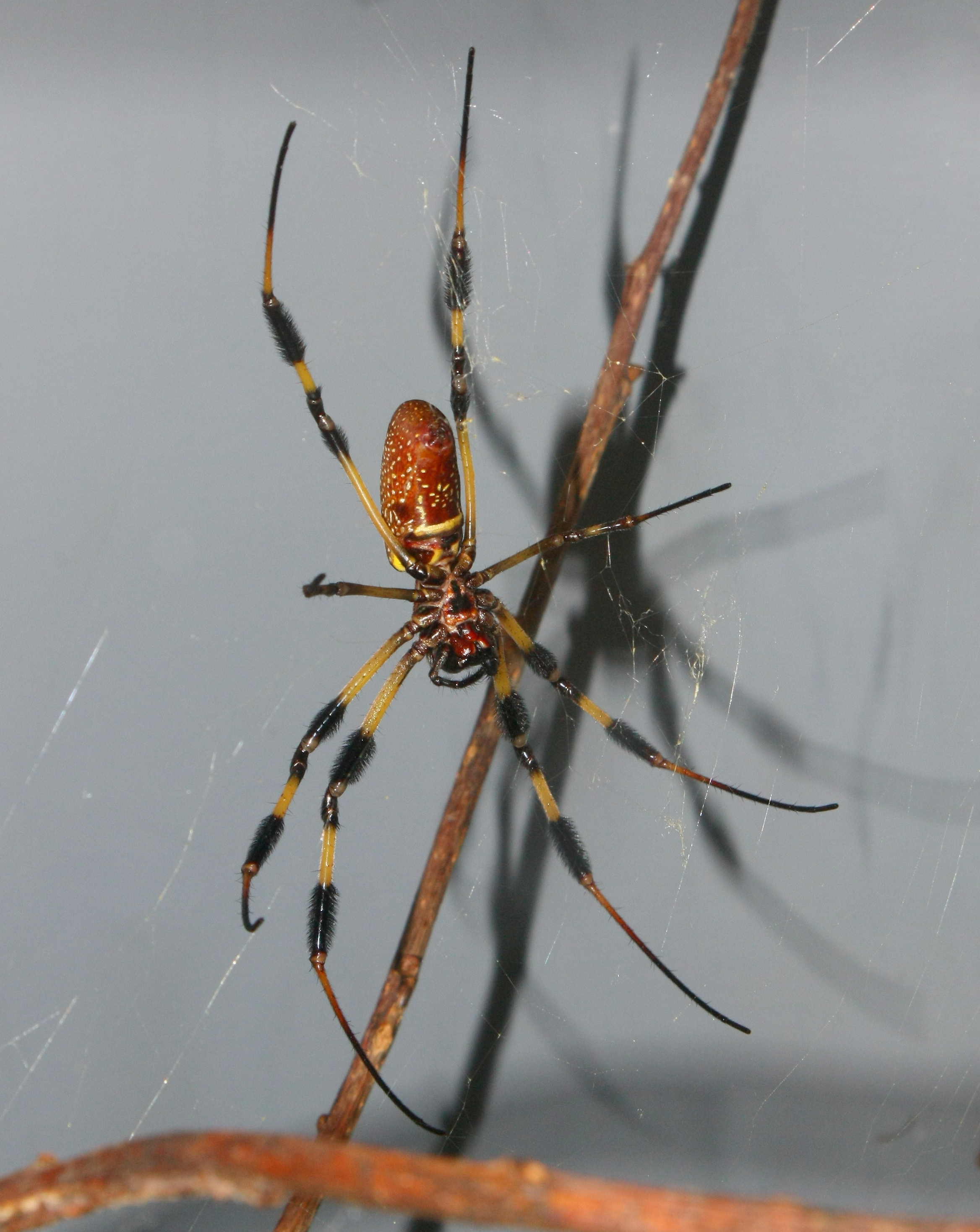
Female ventral side

T. clavipes resemble Trichonephila plumipes in that the females both possess a collection of stiff hair on their legs. However, the hairs of T. plumipes are more closely set together than those of T. clavipes.

=== Etymology of scientific name ===
The specific epithet clavipes is derived from the Latin: clava, which can mean "club" or "knotted staff"; and pes, meaning "of or pertaining to a foot". As a whole, the name means "club-footed." Linnaeus, who named the species in 1767, was likely referring to the noticeable tufts of hair on the females' legs, giving them a clubbed or knotted appearance.

== Population structure, speciation, and phylogeny ==
=== Phylogeny ===
According to some scientists, Trichonephila clavipes belongs to the spider family Nephilidae, or golden orb-weaving spiders. However, other researchers have done away with the Nephilidae family, instead assigning all golden orb-weaving spiders to the subfamily Nephilinae, within the family Araneidae. After the latest phylogenetic studies, the Nephilinae subfamily now contains the genera Nephila, to which T. clavipes originally belonged, and Trichonephila, its current assignment. Of all the Nephilinae genera, Trichonephila is the most species-rich genus.

== Distribution and transport ==
T. clavipes occurs most commonly in the Antilles and in Central America from Mexico in the north through Panama in the south. Less abundantly it occurs as far south as Argentina and in the north it occurs in parts of the southern states of the continental USA. Seasonally, it may range more widely; in the summer, it may be found as far north as lower Eastern Canada. Beyond 40° N latitude, these spiders seldom survive the winter.

T. clavipes may also be found within or near colonies of Metepeira incrassata, a Mexican colonial orb-weaver spider that typically forms large groups, ranging from a few hundreds to thousands of individual spiders.

Because humans inadvertently transport spiders as passengers in cargo containers, plant nursery stock, and the like, T. clavipes generally occurs very unevenly over wide areas; often, patches of high local densities are found far from any other populations. Accidental human transport of the species increases markedly in late August to early September, when the spiders' reproduction is at its height.

In contrast to other species,T. clavipes can benefit from urban habitats and human development, with several individuals found to have grown significantly larger than their rural counterparts when living in more developed areas.

== Mating ==
=== Mate searching behavior ===
In T. clavipes, males move from web to web, attempting to mate with the female web-owners. Males risk death with each move to a new web, largely due to predation, and this mortality risk increases as the breeding season progresses, so that the risk is lower in the early stages of the season and highest in its later stages. As a result, males are more choosy in the early season than they are in the late season.

=== Female/male interactions ===
==== Number of mates ====
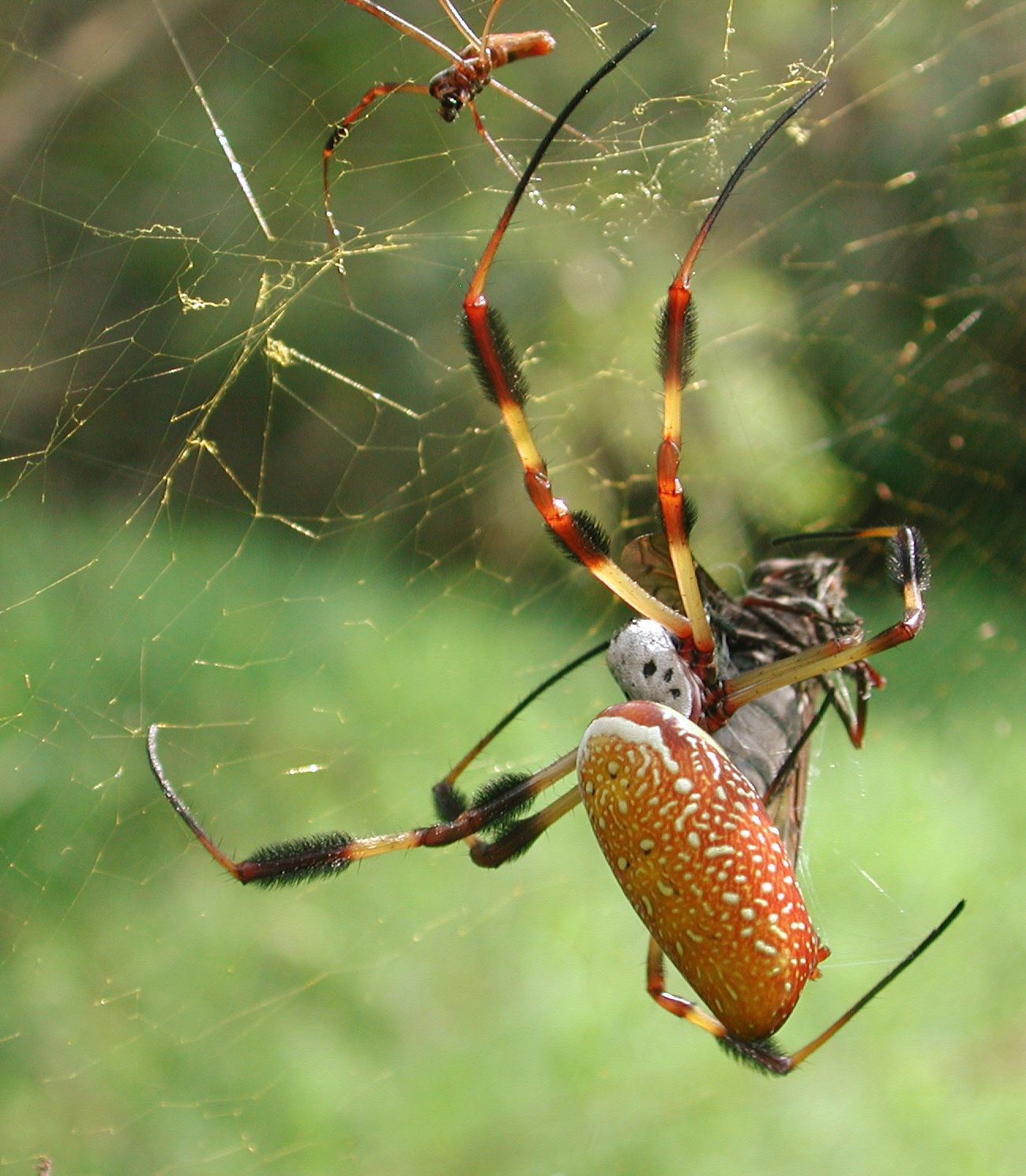
Trichonephila clavipes female in center and male top left.

T. clavipes males may mate just once, monogynously, but are also capable of polygynous mating. In many web-building spider species, including those of the Nephila genus, male spiders are only able to mate once due to behaviors such as sexual cannibalism and genital mutilation during copulation. These spiders thus display monogynous mating systems. Unusually, however, males of T. clavipes rarely face sexual cannibalism or genital mutilation, and are thus able to mate multiply. Monogyny can still occur for many male individuals, though, due to factors like ability to encounter female webs and ability to compete successfully with other males. Another, less conspicuous factor contributing to monogyny is that like many spider species, T. clavipes males produce a limited amount of sperm over their lifetimes. Thus, sometimes a male will only have enough sperm for a single mating, forcing the male to invest in a monogynous relationship rather than searching for further mates.

There are several factors that play into a male's total mate number, but the ability of T. clavipes males to mate multiply allows males of all sizes to have equivalent mating success. It is thought that as a result, there is relaxed selection on male size in T. clavipes and other similar species.

==== Male sperm limitation ====
T. clavipes males have a limited amount of sperm available to them throughout their lifetimes and can therefore only inseminate a few females at most before they die. Multiple mating success is dependent on the first female they choose to mate with: when males mate with virgin, newly molted females, they completely deplete their sperm supply, whereas when they mate with older, non-virgin females, they are able to retain some of their sperm for future matings. Additionally, males may still engage in mating behavior even when they do not have any sperm to give to the female, although the mating behavior is markedly less vigorous. This inability of a male to inseminate further females may explain why male T. clavipes who have mated with virgin females will often remain on the female's web and guard her, rather than leave the web to search for future mates.

==== Mating success with virgin vs. non-virgin females ====
Mating with virgin females can be seen as a high-risk, high-reward situation for males of the species. In situations where male T. clavipes are limited to monogyny in their environment, mating with virgin females offers the most reproductive payoff. Hence, a male using up his entire sperm reserves mating with a virgin makes sense; it allows the male to maximize his potential reproductive success with that single female. However, T. clavipes females do vary in mate quality, and virgin females happen to be the most active during a time period when a female's risk of mortality before she lays her fertilized eggs is highest. Thus, mating once with a virgin female and never mating again, although offering higher potential payoffs, also poses greater risks and a high variability in reproductive success. In fact, mating multiply with two or more non-virgin females is usually just as successful for males as mating monogynously with a virgin female, and given that the risks associated with non-virgin female mating are lower, it is likely that T. clavipes males prefer polygyny over monogyny.

==== Mate guarding ====
Mate guarding by T. clavipes males is size-dependent. Because smaller males are less successful at physically competing with other males, they must invest much more time into successfully mating with a female on her web. As a result, it benefits the male more to search for a new web, rather than to spend even more time on the current web guarding the female with whom he has just mated. Conversely, larger males have a higher chance of winning access to a female at a new web and can thus afford to spend time engaging in mate guarding before searching for a new partner. The trade-off is that increased mate guarding generally results in a lower mate number, so males perceive a benefit in a higher mate number, guarding rates will generally decrease.

Size is just one factor that influences male guarding behavior. Other factors like choice of a virgin female mate and sperm depletion can also make guarding behavior more likely, since the male cannot engage in further matings and no longer experiences a trade-off between guarding and mate searching.

== Webs ==
=== Web type ===
T. clavipes females construct large, vertical, asymmetric circular ("orb"-shaped) webs. The main web of a mature female can range from 1–2 meters in diameter, not counting the main filaments that anchor the web between trees; such anchor filaments may be 2–3 meters in length. A yellow pigment in the silk lends it a rich, golden glow in suitable lighting. As with many other orb-webs, it is common to see a trail of organic waste above the center which, as research has shown, attracts prey thanks to its rotten smell. Given its size, the web is easily damaged by large flying bugs, birds, or debris; and needs to be repaired constantly.

== Physiology ==
=== Glands and toxins ===
==== Silk glands ====
There are seven different types of silk glands across the orb-weaving spider species, each producing its own type of silk, and T. clavipes females possess all seven of these silk glands. The glands are: (i) major ampullate, (ii) minor ampullate, (iii) piriform, (iv) aciniform, (v) tubuliform, (vi) flagelliform, and (vii) aggregate. The major ampullate silk shows high tensile strength and is thus used in structures that require stability, such as draglines, bridgelines, and the radii of webs. Minor ampullate silk is used as scaffolding during the web-building process, while piriform silk is used like cement, bonding fibers to each other and other structures. Aciniform silk is also strong, like major ampullate silk, but is flexible as well, allowing it to be used for wrapping prey and insulating egg cases. Tubuliform silk forms the tough outer shell of egg cases, and the flagelliform and aggregate silks are used in prey capture for their extensibility and stickiness. These silks differ in the specific spider fibroin, or "spidroin," proteins that comprise them.

A single thread of the anchor silk has a tensile strength of 4 × 10^{9} N/m^{2}, which exceeds that of steel by a factor of eight (ultimate strength of steel 500 × 10^{6} N/m^{2}). Research at Iowa State University has shown that T. clavipes silk, specifically in the draglines, has exceptionally high thermal conductivity, exceeding that of most metals.

== Diet ==
T. clavipes feed on small flying insects. Webs constructed by this species are used to catch this prey. They can feed on grasshoppers, flies, and other small insects. As the prey is entangled in the strong web, T. clavipes wrap it in silk like a casing.

== Bites to humans and animals ==
The spider is not aggressive and only bites if handled roughly; the venom is relatively harmless and rarely causes more than slight redness and temporary localized pain.

== Significance to humans ==
=== Usefulness in spider research ===
T. clavipes has been incredibly useful in the study of spidroins; its spidroins were the first to be characterized, and its genome has been the first of the orb-weaving spiders to be annotated, contributing information about 28 unique spidroins. In addition, T. clavipes had been chosen, because of its highly asymmetric web and elongated body shape, for an experiment in the ISS to test the effect of zero gravity on web-related behaviour.

=== Usefulness in medicine ===
The silk of T. clavipes has recently been investigated to evaluate its usefulness in surgically improving mammalian neuronal regeneration. In vitro experiments showed that a filament of the silk can lead a severed neuron through the body to the site from which it was severed. The silk elicits no reaction from the immune system, and thereby escapes rejection by the host body.
