= Playing God (2012 film) =

- Directed by: Matthew Dyas
- Written by: Matthew Dyas
- Narrated by: Adam Rutherford
- Distributed by: BBC
- Release date: 2012
- Running time: 59 minutes
- Language: English

Playing God is a 2012 BBC documentary in the Horizon series, hosted by Adam Rutherford. The documentary discusses synthetic biology, the potential of science "breaking down nature into spare parts" and then rebuilding it back up as we wish.

== Summary ==
Adam Rutherford has been studying the emerging field of synthetic biology for the past 10 years and believes that this sort of genetic tinkering is the most effective way to pass along traits between different organisms, given that this result cannot be easily obtained through typical mating of certain species. In Playing God, he discusses the creation of the spider-goat by American researchers. It is a part goat, part spider hybrid, whose genetic code has been altered to be able to produce the same proteins found in spider silk. The milk produced by these goats can be used to create an artificial spider's web. Typically this silk is produced in small quantities by spiders but with the genetic modification of the goats, it may be mass produced. The goats are easier to handle in large groups than spiders and thus this could potentially increase the efficiency of silk production and consumer cost.

This technology is also being used to make bio-diesel to power cars. Biotech company, Amyris, in Emeryville, California, has applied synthetic biology to yeast. Instead of producing alcohol through the fermentation of sugar, this yeast produces diesel. The amount of diesel that is produced by this method is substantially greater than that of the conventional method and can exponentially increase the rate of production. This diesel has already been implemented in actual cars, in Brazil.

Other researchers are looking at how we might, one day, control human emotions by sending 'biological machines' into our brains. MIT professor Ed Boyden leads a group in synthetic neuroscience. This team utilizes the genetic code for molecules that convert light into electrical energy and inserts it in a virus or cassette that may be installed into various organisms. Because the brain works on electrical impulses, this technology may be applied to neural circuits, in order to treat various neurological disorders. With this technology, the direct control of various light sensitive and electrical functions in the brain would be enabled.

MIT professor, Ron Weiss, has worked extensively in this field and has been leading a team in incorporating the concepts of computer programming and engineering to biology. "I decided to take what we understand in computing and apply that to programming biology. To me, that's really the essence of synthetic biology." Weiss' team published a study that discusses how they combined computer circuit elements with BioBricks parts. The way this works is that the computer circuit is able to distinguish between a healthy and mutated cell by utilizing a set of five criteria. Any cells that satisfy these conditions are deleted, similar to the way code could eliminate certain functions in computer programming. The ability to target individual cells could make this an alternative to treatments that may have harmful effects on healthy cells, such as chemotherapy.

== Scientific Concepts ==
The area of synthetic biology is extensively discussed in Playing God. This is considered to be a relatively new field that incorporates elements of engineering into biology. It involves the blending and manipulation of natural molecules and unnatural molecules to obtain a specific outcome. Through this mean, scientists may use biology as a base for the development of synthetic life and genetic coding. This area of study has been noted with the potential to increase the efficiency of the production of certain biomolecules and naturally occurring materials, such as enzymes.

== Reception ==
Playing God and presenter, Adam Rutherford, have been subject to criticism following the release of this documentary. As plainly stated by Andrew Marszal of The Telegraph, "Rutherford overcooked it, particularly in his opening gambit – the revelation that scientists have developed a new hybrid breed of 'spider-goats'... we were left a little disappointed as Freckles, Pudding and Sweetie chomped and grazed around the farm looking for all the world like, well, goats." The portrayal of the applications of synthetic biology in this documentary appeared to be exaggerated and their importance not adequately stressed. The Alliance for Natural Health International (ANHI) wrote a reaction piece in which it expressed concern about the overwhelmingly positive tone the documentary as a whole had towards the development of this technology. "The programme was almost wholly positive about the new technology, even though it has many serious potential consequences for humans and the planet... Dr Rutherford reacts like a kid in a sweetshop at each new technological marvel. Not once does he question whether creating spider-goats is necessary, or whether the 'trickle-down' of genetic engineering into the community is a step too far."
