= Jem Stansfield =

British engineer, inventor and television personality (born 1970)

- Born: December 1970 (age 55)
- Education: Bristol University
- Occupations: Engineer; Television Presenter

Jeremy Stansfield (born December 1970) is a British engineer and television presenter who is best known for presenting the BBC One science show Bang Goes the Theory.

== Career ==
Stansfield has a degree in aeronautics from Bristol University and, before his television career, worked in a Czech school, as a shepherd in the Australian outback, and briefly in stand-up comedy. Stansfield was an on-screen ballistics expert for the television show Scrapheap Challenge and went on to become a permanent part of the engineering team for subsequent series.

Among his inventions are a compressed-air powered motorcycle, and boots that walk on water (for which he won a New Scientist prize).

In 2010, Stansfield used vacuum cleaners to create "Spider-Man style" climbing gloves, climbing 30 feet up a brick wall. He also drove a modified 1988 Volkswagen Scirocco 210 miles from London to Manchester using coffee granules for fuel.

In 2013, Stansfield sustained injuries during filming of a segment for the series Bang Goes the Theory. The segment was about the safety of front-facing and rear-facing seats in car crashes. Stansfield was in a cart which crashed, simulating the impact of a car hitting a lamppost and suffered from spine and brain injuries as a result.

In 2021, Stansfield was awarded £1.6m in damages after a High Court battle. It emerged in court that the BBC had been warned of the dangers by crash test experts but this information was never passed to Stansfield.

== Filmography ==
=== Television ===
Year	Title	Credit	Notes
2001–2003	Science Shack	Presenter	
2002–2003	Home On Their Own	Inventor / Engineer	
2004	Zero to Hero	Engineer	
2006	Scrapheap Challenge	Staff Engineer	Briefly credited as "Ballistics Expert"
2006	Men in White		
2006	Wild Thing: I Love You	Presenter / Aeronautical Engineer	
2008	Planet Mechanics	Presenter	8 episodes
2009–2014	Bang Goes the Theory	Presenter / Head of Engineering	49 episodes
2010	Explosions: How We Shook the World	Presenter	Documentary
2010	Wallace and Gromit's World of Invention	Science correspondent	
2011	Big, Bigger, Biggest	Presenter / Engineer	4 episodes
2012	Horizon	Presenter	April 2012 episode entitled "Stuff: A Horizon Guide to Materials"
2012	Stargazing Challenges	Presenter	
2013	Newsround	Judge	for "You Too Could be an Absolute Genius" segment

=== Film ===
Year	Title	Credit	Notes
1998	Lost in Space	Special effects technician	For Magic Camera Company
1998	The Avengers	Special effects	
2004	Van Helsing	Special effects	
