= Roseibacterium =

Scientific classification
- Domain: Bacteria
- Kingdom: Pseudomonadati
- Phylum: Pseudomonadota
- Class: Alphaproteobacteria
- Order: Rhodobacterales
- Family: Rhodobacteraceae
- Genus: Roseibacterium; Rathgeber et al. 2005

Species
- Roseibacterium elongatum

Genus of bacteria

Roseibacterium is a genus of bacteria in the family Rhodobacteraceae.
