= VSX2 =

Protein-coding gene in the species Homo sapiens

Identifiers
- Aliases: VSX2, CHX10, HOX10, MCOP2, MCOPCB3, RET1, visual system homeobox 2
- External IDs: OMIM: 142993; MGI: 88401; GeneCards: VSX2

Gene location (Human)
Chr.	Chromosome 14 (human)
Band	14q24.3	Start	74,239,449 bp
Band	14q24.3	End	74,262,738 bp

Gene location (Mouse)
Chr.	Chromosome 12 (mouse)
Band	12 D1|12 39.28 cM	Start	84,616,536 bp
Band	12 D1|12 39.28 cM	End	84,642,231 bp
RNA expression pattern
Bgee	Human / Mouse (ortholog); Top expressed in: testicle; gonad; lymph node; C1 segment; nucleus of brain; substantia nigra; subcutaneous adipose tissue; hypothalamus; anterior pituitary / Top expressed in: neural layer of retina; lens; ciliary body; corneal stroma; inner nuclear layer; iris; lumbar subsegment of spinal cord; epithelium of lens; gastrula; central gray substance of midbrain; More reference expression data
BioGPS	n/a
Gene ontology
Molecular function	sequence-specific DNA binding; DNA binding; DNA-binding transcription factor activity, RNA polymerase II-specific
Cellular component	nucleus
Biological process	multicellular organism development; regulation of transcription, DNA-templated; transcription, DNA-templated; response to stimulus; visual perception; regulation of transcription by RNA polymerase II
Sources:Amigo / QuickGO
Orthologs
Databases	NCBI: entry; OMA: entry
Species	Human	Mouse
Entrez	338917	12677
Ensembl	ENSG00000119614	ENSMUSG00000021239
UniProt	P58304	Q61412
RefSeq (mRNA)	NM_182894	NM_001301427; NM_007701
RefSeq (protein)	NP_878314	NP_001288356; NP_031727
Location (UCSC)	Chr 14: 74.24 – 74.26 Mb	Chr 12: 84.62 – 84.64 Mb
PubMed search
- Wikidata
View/Edit Human	View/Edit Mouse

Visual system homeobox 2 is a protein that in humans is encoded by the VSX2 gene.
