= Heather Whalley =

Scottish neuroscientist

- Education: University of Edinburgh
- Scientific career
- Fields: Neuroscience; Neuroimaging
- Workplaces: University of Edinburgh
- Thesis: Functional neuroimaging in subjects at high genetic risk of schizophrenia (2005)
- Doctoral advisor: Eve Johnstone

Heather Clare Whalley is a Scottish scientist. She is a Professor of Neuroscience and Mental Health neuroimaging at the Centre for Clinical Brain Sciences, University of Edinburgh, and is an affiliate member of the Centre for Genomic and Experimental Medicine at the University of Edinburgh. Her main focus of research is on the mechanisms underlying the development of major psychiatric disorders using the latest genomic and neuroimaging approaches (genetic, epigenetic, and multimodal imaging).

== Education ==
Heather completed her MSc (Distinction) & PhD at the Division of Psychiatry at the University of Edinburgh, investigating neuroimaging data in adolescent individuals at familial risk for psychiatric conditions. She has since been awarded a Royal Society Dorothy Hodgkin Fellowship, a John, Margaret, Alfred and Stewart Sim (JMAS) Research Fellowship from the Royal College of Physicians of Edinburgh, and an Edinburgh Scientist Academic Track (ESAT) Fellowship from the University of Edinburgh.

== Career ==
She leads the imaging research group in psychiatry at the University of Edinburgh which has extensive links with several international consortia including the Psychiatric Genomics Consortia, IMAGEMEND and ENIGMA. The group focuses on how causal factors (genetic and environmental) contribute to conditions through their impact on brain structure and function using large population-based data resources where available, and identifying how brain structure and function mediate effects on behaviour.

== Selected publications ==
- A Phenome-Wide Association and Mendelian Randomisation Study of Polygenic Risk for Depression in UK Biobank Shen X, et al. Nature Communications, 2020 11 (1)
- The neurobiology of personal control during reward learning and its relationship to mood. L Romaniuk et al. & HC Whalley. Biological Psychiatry: Cognitive Neuroscience and Neuroimaging, 2019 4 (2), 190-199
- Genome-wide meta-analysis of depression identifies 102 independent variants and highlights the importance of the prefrontal brain regions DM Howard, et al. Nature neuroscience, 2019 22 (3), 343
- Resting-state connectivity and its association with cognitive performance, educational attainment, and household income in the UK Biobank. X Shen et al. & HC Whalley. Biological Psychiatry: Cognitive Neuroscience and Neuroimaging, 2018 3 (10), 878-886
- Association of Whole-Genome and NETRIN1 Signaling Pathway–Derived Polygenic Risk Scores for Major Depressive Disorder and White Matter Microstructure in the UK Biobank. MC Barbu et al. & HC Whalley. Biological Psychiatry: Cognitive Neuroscience and Neuroimaging, 2018 4 (1), 91-100
- Longitudinal differences in white matter integrity in youth at high familial risk for bipolar disorder.R Ganzola et al. & HC Whalley. Bipolar disorders, 2017 19 (3), 158-167
- Cognitive biases predict symptoms of depression, anxiety and wellbeing above and beyond neuroticism in adolescence. EM Smith, S Reynolds, F Orchard, HC Whalley*, SWY Chan*. Journal of affective disorders, 2018 241, 446-453
- Deactivation in anterior cingulate cortex during facial processing in young individuals with high familial risk and early development of depression: f MRI findings from the ...SWY Chan et al. & HC Whalley. Journal of Child Psychology and Psychiatry 57 (11), 1277-1286
- Dissection of major depressive disorder using polygenic risk scores for schizophrenia in two independent cohorts. HC Whalley et al. Translational psychiatry 6 (11), e938
