= Richard Frackowiak =

Neuroimaging researcher (born 1950)

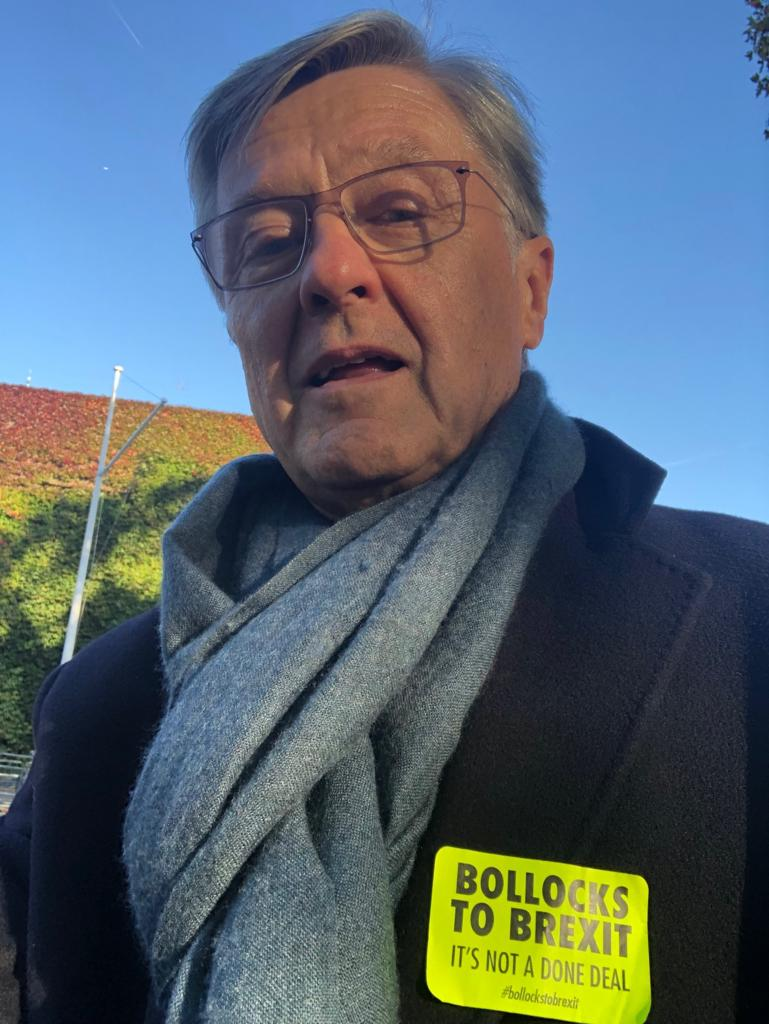
- Frackowiak in 2016
- Born: 26 March 1950 (age 76); London, England
- Education: University of Cambridge
- Known for: Neuroscientist

Richard Stanislaus Joseph Frackowiak (born 26 March 1950 in London) is a British and French neurologist and neuroscientist. He is best known for his role in the development of neuroimaging, as the founding director of the Functional Imaging Laboratory (FIL) at University College London (UCL) and as one of the initiators, in 2013, of the Human Brain Project (HBP), a ten-year European project coordinated by the École Polytechnique Fédérale de Lausanne (EPFL) with the goal of advancing knowledge in the fields of neuroscience, computing and brain-related medicine.

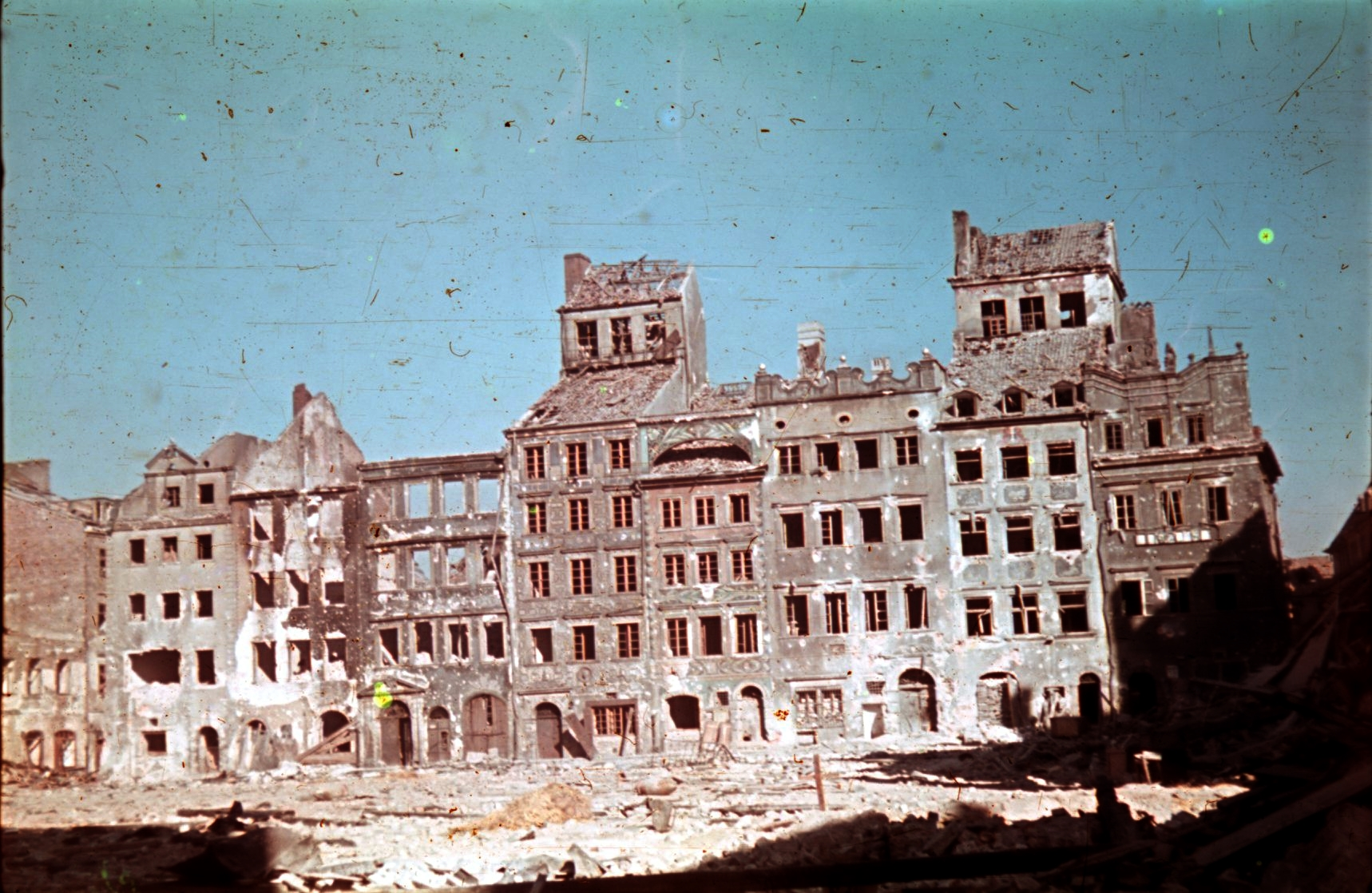
Old Town Market Place, Warsaw, during the Warsaw Uprising, August 1944; photo taken by Ewa Faryaszewska, a corporal in the Polish Home Army

== Early life and education ==
During World War II, his father fought on different fronts in the ranks of the Polish 1st Armoured Division (1 Dywizja Pancerna), his wartime engagements culminating in the Normandy theatre of operations (6 June – 12 September 1944). His mother took part in the Warsaw Uprising (1 August – 2 October 1944), during which she was captured and interned at a series of Nazi concentration camps culminating in Bergen-Belsen. After the camp was liberated in April 1945, she went to England where her sister was living. It was through the Polish émigré community in London that she met her future husband.

Born in London five years later, Richard Frackowiak won a scholarship to Latymer Upper School in that city, but learned Polish at home with his parents and at Polish school on Saturdays (he jokes that he speaks a Polish that dates to 1945). At the age of 15 he began to think about a career in medicine, inspired by the family doctor, a Polish bachelor who often visited the family and who had also taken part in the Warsaw Uprising. The stories the doctor told about working as a surgeon for the resistance, operating in cellars in rudimentary conditions, left a profound impression on the teenage boy. At school he distinguished himself in biology, chemistry and physics and showed an early fascination for the workings of the brain.

He undertook his medical studies at Peterhouse, Cambridge, to which he also won a scholarship, and he completed the final three years of those studies at the Middlesex Hospital Medical School, which later merged with the medical school of University College London (UCL). In 1983 he defended his Doctor of Medicine thesis on the quantitative measurement of cerebral blood flow by positron emission tomography (PET).

== Personal life ==
Frackowiak has been married twice and has three children from his first marriage. He lives in Paris with his second wife, science journalist Laura Spinney.

== Professional career ==
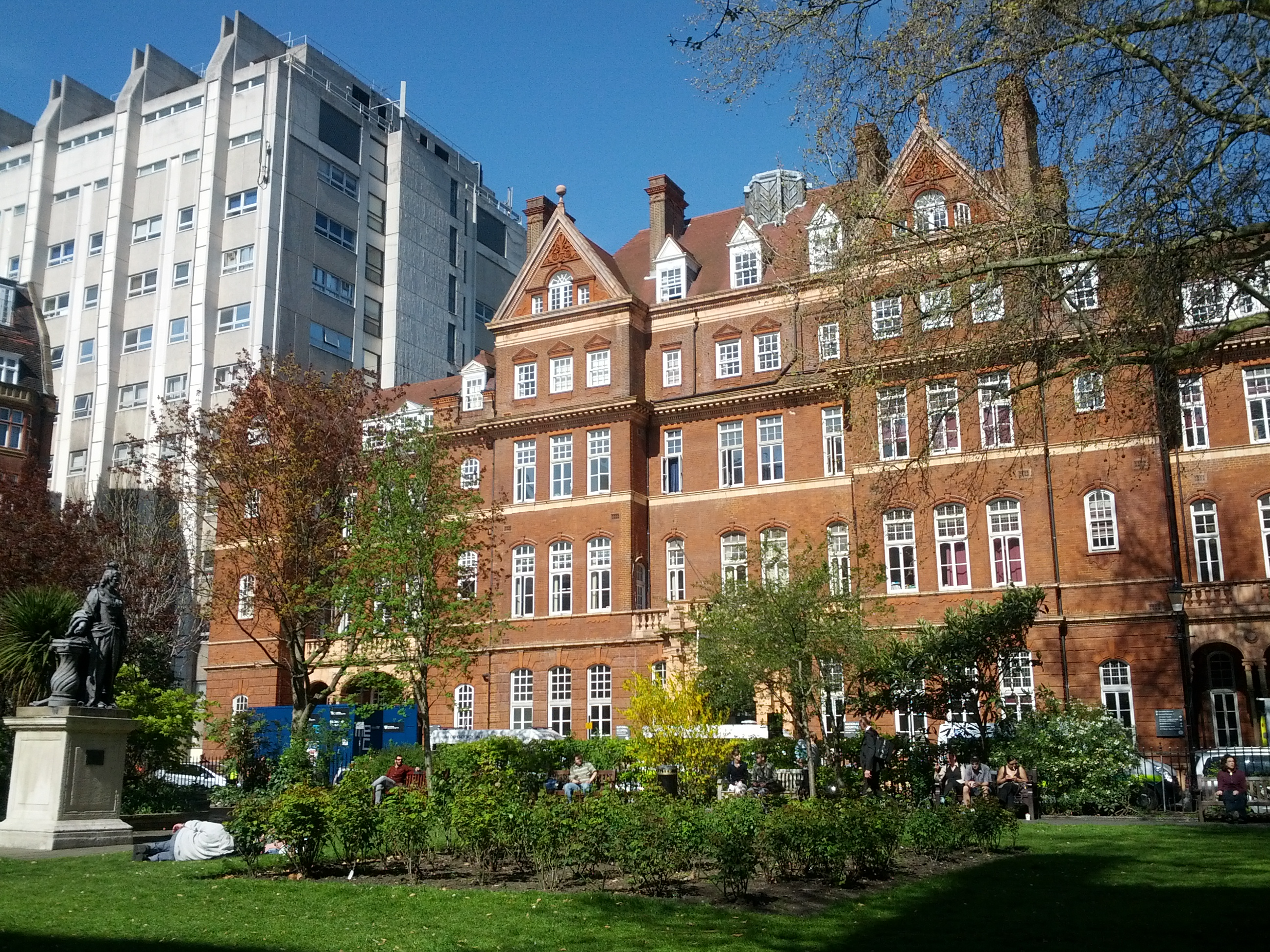
National Hospital for Neurology and Neurosurgery main entrance and (left) Institute of Neurology, Queen Square, London

From 1984 to 1993, Frackowiak directed the neurology service of the Hammersmith Hospital in London, and from 1988 to 1993 he was deputy director of the Medical Research Council Cyclotron Unit at the same hospital. In 1990, he took up a joint chair of neurology at Hammersmith and the UCL Institute of Neurology in Queen Square, London where, in 1994, he founded the Wellcome Department of Imaging Neuroscience and its Functional Imaging Laboratory (FIL). Terry Jones was his mentor in neuroimaging, and Karl J. Friston, Chris Frith and Raymond Dolan were founding principal investigator colleagues at the FIL.

In 1998, he was named director of the UCL Institute of Neurology, a post he held until 2002. Between 2002 and 2009 he was Vice-Provost (Special Projects) of UCL, and a proponent of a failed attempt to merge Imperial College London and UCL.

Between 2003 and 2009, he directed the Department of Cognitive Studies (DEC) of the École normale supérieure (Paris), where he and others created a joint Masters programme in Brain and Mind Sciences between what was then Pierre and Marie Curie University (part of Sorbonne University), the École normale supérieure and UCL. He sits on the Board of directors of the Brain and Spine Institute in Paris, whose neuroimaging activities he helped set up.

He served as scientific advisor to the President-Director General of the French National Institute of Health and Medical Research (Inserm) between 2007 and 2014, and in 2010 he led an international jury selecting the best research projects of the French instituts hospitalo-universitaires (IHU) investment programme created the previous year by the French President Nicolas Sarkozy. Concurrently he joined the jury of the Initiative d'excellence (IDEX) partner programme, that was designed to promote the consolidation and transformation of French universities.

In 2009, he was named professor and head of the neurology service of the Lausanne University Hospital of the University of Lausanne (UNIL) in Switzerland. In 2013, he took up a post as titular professor at the École polytechnique fédérale de Lausanne (EPFL), in the laboratory of neuroscientist Henry Markram’s Blue Brain Project. With Markram and physicist Karlheinz Meier, he launched the Human Brain Project, which was financed partly by the European Commission, becoming its medical co-director.

He retired from his clinical and HBP-related activities in 2015, but remains scientifically active as a titular professor at the EPFL and as a permanent visitor at the École normale supérieure in Paris. He is a professor emeritus at UCL.

As chair of the medical sciences committee of Brussels-based Science Europe, in 2016 he lobbied successfully for exemptions to the European Union (EU)’s General Data Protection Regulation, to facilitate data-led clinical and public health research in the EU.

== Research ==
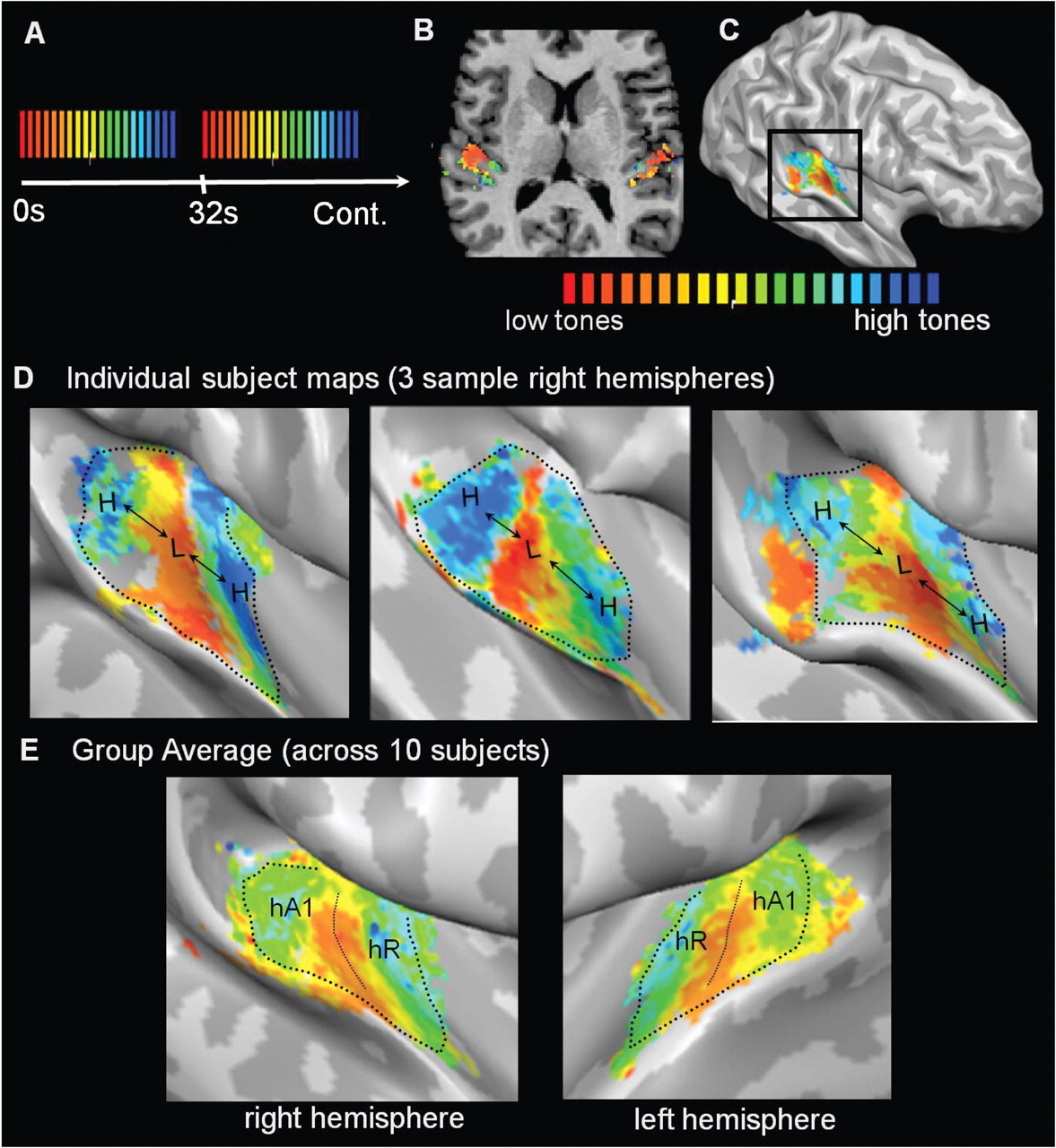
Tonotopic maps in human auditory cortex

Frackowiak first became interested in the pathophysiology of various neurological disorders. His research formed the basis of the clinical applications of positron emission tomography (PET). In the early 1990s he turned his attention to the imagery of cerebral functions, and his group became a leader in the study of functional cerebral localisations, notably through the application of functional magnetic resonance imaging (fMRI), which provides high-quality structural and functional images with high spatial resolution and without radiation exposure. The automated image generation and analysis process was standardised to create functional brain maps (brain morphometry based on voxels). These techniques made it possible to demonstrate the existence of the brain's dynamic neuronal plasticity, both in its functions and in its structure, and both in normal subjects and in patients with neurological and neuropsychiatric disorders. Others of the group's studies showed the ability of the brain to reorganise itself after traumatic brain injury, through practice and learning.

Two editions of the textbook Human Brain Function, co-edited by Frackowiak and published by Academic Press in 1997 and 2004, summarise the research conducted at the FIL over ten years. In January 2021, he had an h index of 210.

== Distinctions (selection) ==
- 1995 founder member of the Academia Europaea
- 1997 Neuronal Plasticity Prize (with Antonio Damasio and Michael Merzenich)
- 1997 Prize of the Feldberg Foundation for Anglo-German Scientific Exchange
- 1998 founding fellow of the UK Academy of Medical Sciences
- 1999 Doctor honoris causa of the University of Liège
- 2000 honorary member of the American Neurological Association
- 2003 Ig Nobel Prize (with Eleanor Maguire and others at University College London) "for presenting evidence that the brains of London taxi drivers are more highly developed than those of their fellow citizens"
- 2004 K-J. Zülch Prize of the Max Planck Society for the Advancement of Science, for "imaging measurement methods to investigate the functional architecture of the human brain"
- 2004–2007 President of the British Neuroscience Association
- 2009–2010 President of the European Brain and Behaviour Society
- 2013 member of the Polish Academy of Sciences
- 2020 corresponding member of the Polish Academy of Arts and Sciences
