= Roberto Toro =

French neuroscientist

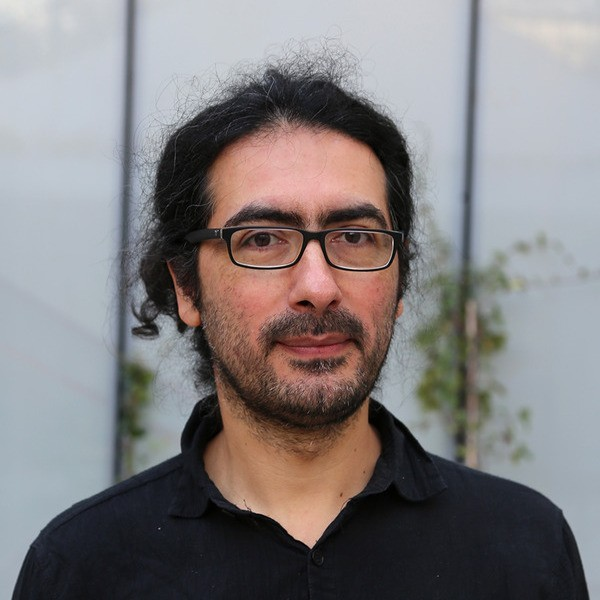
- Roberto Toro
- Education: Universidad Técnica Federico Santa María; University of Paris
- Awards: Open Science Prize (2016)
- Scientific career
- Fields: Neuroscience
- Workplaces: Institut Pasteur; Université Paris Cité
- Website: research.pasteur.fr/en/member/roberto-toro

Roberto Toro is a neuroscientist of Chilean origin, and is now Director of Research at the Neuroscience Department of the Institut Pasteur in Paris. His research focuses on the development and evolution of the brain, specifically using mathematical modelling, magnetic resonance imaging and genetics to better understand the origin of neocortical organisation. He develops computational neuroanatomy methods to analyse the normal diversity of human brain anatomy, and to look for differences associated with neurodevelopmental pathologies, in particular autism spectrum disorders. Roberto is an open science advocate and aims at a more collaborative and open science, allowing anyone to take part in the research process.

== Education ==
After a degree in engineering at the Universidad Santa María in Chile, he obtained a PhD in Cognitive Science and Neuroscience at the University of Paris in 2003.

== Career and research ==
After postdoctoral fellowships at the Institut des Sciences Cognitives, Bron, and the Brain & Body Centre, University of Nottingham, he started his career at the Neuroscience Department at Institut Pasteur, working as a researcher at the Unit of Human Genetics and Brain Function. In 2015, he became Group leader at the Unit of Human Genetics and Brain Function. Since 2021, he heads the Research Unit for Applied and Theoretical Neuroanatomy at Institut Pasteur.

In his research, Roberto Toro studies various aspects of the relationship between brain geometry and brain organisation. His team develops biomechanical models of brain development showing how growth can trigger mechanical instabilities which constrain and guide developmental and evolutionary processes. They study in particular the development of the ferret brain as an example of a complex, folded, mammalian brain. They also look across many different species, collecting and analysing data from hundreds of different mammals. Overall, they argue that intrinsic constraints related to mechanical morphogenesis may play an important role in the development and evolution of the primate brain.

His research combining neuroimaging and genetics has contributed to our understanding of the polygenic architecture of human neuroanatomical variability. He develops computational neuroanatomy methods to analyse the normal diversity of human brain anatomy, and to look for differences associated with neurodevelopmental pathologies. He is particularly interested in autism spectrum disorders (ASD), and his team became the first French group to participate in project ABIDE – the largest open dataset of autism brain imaging in the world. Their attempts to replicate several major candidate neuroimaging endophenotypes of ASD using this large dataset together with systematic meta-analysis revealed no statistically significant differences. The team showed, on the contrary, a strong and statistically significant heterogeneity in the literature, dramatic lack of statistical power, and evidence of publication bias.

His team organised the first international data science challenge to predict autism diagnosis from MRI data. The project revealed the strong potential of MRI for detecting biomarkers of autism, as well as the danger of overfitting that comes with the methods in uncontrolled settings, and the data generated and shared for this project has enabled several independent analyses projects.

Aiming at allowing anyone to take part in the research process, his team develops open Web applications for scientific collaboration, such as MicroDraw – a Web tool for the visualisation and collaborative annotation of high-resolution histological data – and BrainBox – a Web tool for the indexation, visualisation, and real time collaborative segmentation of open brain imaging data.

=== Awards ===
- 2019 Pro Aid Autisme Prize
- 2016 Chaire Charles Nicolle, Institut Pasteur
- 2016 Open Science Prize of the Wellcome Trust, the National Institutes of Health and the Howard Hughes Medical Institute
