= Paul Younger =

Paul Younger may refer to:

- Paul "Tank" Younger (1928–2001), American football player
- Paul Younger (engineer) (1962–2018), British hydrogeologist
