= Afterglow (drug culture) =

Positive effects that linger beyond the main effects

Afterglow, when used in the context of recreational drug use, refers to positive physical and mental effects that linger after the main effects of a drug have subsided, or after the peak experience has subsided. This state is often characterized by feelings of detachment or increased psychological clarity. The term is most commonly associated with hallucinogens, particularly psychedelics and entactogens. Psychiatrist Walter Pahnke described afterglow as an "elevated and energetic mood with a relative freedom from concerns of the past and from guilt and anxiety."

This phenomenon contrasts with hangovers, a condition that follows the use of various substances, including alcohol.

Common effects of afterglow are described by many drug users:

- Increased confidence
- State of inner peace
- Feeling "cleansed"
- Insomnia

Most drugs do not typically cause afterglow, but some (like MDMA) can.

Afterglow may also occur after the usage of dissociative drugs, such as the NMDA antagonists, dextromethorphan, ketamine, and phencyclidine.

Afterglow occurs after the comedown or landing. Afterglow slowly fades, but can last as short as 24-hours, while some positive post-acute phase of psychedelic drug effects (characterized by elevated mood and openness) have been reported to extend between 6 and 8 weeks.

Animal research has suggested a neurobiological basis for the afterglow: a 2023 study by Nardou, Dölen et al. published in Nature found that psychedelics reopen a critical period of neural plasticity in mice.

== See also ==
- Psychedelic drug § Psychedelic afterglows
