= Cathy Price =

British neuroscientist

Cathy Price FRS FBA FMedSci
- Born: Catherine J. Price
- Education: Birkbeck College
- Scientific career
- Fields: Cognitive neuroscience
- Workplaces: University College London
- Thesis: (1990)
- Academic advisors: Karl Friston
- Notable students: Maria Luisa Gorno-Tempini
- Website: www.fil.ion.ucl.ac.uk/Price/

Catherine J. Price is a British neuroscientist and academic. She is Professor of Cognitive Neuroscience and director of the Wellcome Trust Centre for Neuroimaging at University College London.

Her overarching research goal is to provide a model of the neural basis of language that predicts and explains speech and language difficulties and their recovery after brain damage (stroke or neurosurgery).

== Education ==
Price obtained her bachelor's degree in 1984, and her PhD in 1990, both from Birkbeck College.

Professor Kia Nobre, who nominated Price for the 5th Suffrage award for Life Sciences, said: "She blossomed through the trenches of a very macho world with gentle words, generous deeds, scientific commitment and rigour, genuine translation of research to clinical benefit, and humour."

Price originally trained as a neuropsychologist studying reading and object recognition in patients with brain damage. In 1991, she joined the Medical Research Council (MRC) cyclotron unit at the inception of human brain mapping and used PET scanning to provide new insights into the functional anatomy of reading, speech perception, speech production and semantics.

== Research and career ==
In 1995, Price moved to University College London using MRI scanning to show how language abilities and IQ are reflected in brain structure. For example, by combining structural and functional imaging data from healthy participants, Price has shown the remarkable effect that learning has on the structure of the brain. This is illustrated in a series of 3 Nature papers that map structural brain changes associated with (i) learning a second language, (ii) learning to read in adulthood and (iii) naturally occurring changes in verbal and nonverbal IQ in the teenage brain.

Price has made two strong theoretical claims. Contrary to traditional views, her “cognitive ontologies” theory claimed that there are no parts of the human brain that are dedicated to language processing. Instead, specialisation for all types of language processing emerge through cross-talk among unique combinations of areas that are each involved in many other non-linguistic functions. Redefining the functional components of language, in terms of the underlying neural systems would, Price proposes, allow us to generate cognitive models that are both physiologically plausible and clinically useful. Her “cognitive degeneracy” theory claimed that the same language task can be supported by different neural pathways, and that an understanding of when and why different neural pathways are used is essential for understanding how patients recover language after brain damage.

Since 2012, Price has turned her attention to developing a tool for predicting language outcome and recovery after stroke (the PLORAS study). To this end, she is creating a database that provides easy access to multiple sources of information (behaviour, demographics, brain structure and function) from thousands of stroke survivors. Predictions for new patients are based on how others with similar brain damage and demographics were observed to recover from the same symptoms. The same data, and the theory of cognitive degeneracy, can also be used to explain recovery in terms of the degree to which patients have preserved the set of neural pathways needed to produce speech and language (Seghier and Price, 2018).

In March 2020, her h-index is 86 from a total of 322 papers, with more than 24,000 citations.

== Awards and honours ==
- The Minnie Mitchel Goodall Studentship (1989)
- Wellcome Trust Senior Research Fellowship (1997)
- Organization for Human Brain Mapping Early Career Investigator Award (2001).
- Human Brain Mapping Editor's Choice Award (2006)
- Justine et Yves Sergent award (2008)
- Ipsen Foundation Neuropsychology Prize (2012)
- Wellcome Trust Principal Research Fellowship (2012)
- Fellow of the Academy of Medical Sciences (FMedSci) (2014)
- Wellcome Trust Principal Research Fellowship (2017
- 5th Suffrage award for Life Sciences (2018)
- Fellow of the Royal Society (FRS) (2020)
- Fellow of the British Academy (FBA) (2022)
