= Karen Johnson (scientist) =

British geologist and academic

- Born: Karen L. Johnson
- Education: Newcastle University; University College London
- Scientific career
- Workplaces: Durham University; Newcastle University
- Thesis: Manganese in mine water and its removal by passive treatment (2002)

Karen L. Johnson is a British geologist who is a professor in environmental engineering at Durham University. She was awarded the 2023 Royal Society Rosalind Franklin Award.

== Early life and education ==
Johnson studied hydrogeology at University College London. After earning her master's degree in 1995, she joined the water industry. She eventually returned to academia and completed a doctoral degree at Newcastle University with Paul Younger. She stayed at Newcastle as a postdoctoral researcher.

== Research and career ==
In 2005, Johnson joined Durham University, where she was made Professor of Environmental Engineering. Her work considers waste water, and the identification of strategies to treat waste water. Alongside treating waste water in the United Kingdom, Johnson has worked on various international ecology projects, including investigating the interplay between land insecurity and poverty.

== Awards and honours ==
- 2011 Philip Leverhulme Prize in Engineering
- 2023 Royal Society Rosalind Franklin Award

== Selected publications ==
- Lawrence I Bowden; Adam P Jarvis; Paul L. Younger; Karen L Johnson (1 April 2009). "Phosphorus removal from waste waters using basic oxygen steel slag". Environmental Science & Technology. 43 (7): 2476–2481. Bibcode:2009EnST...43.2476B. doi:10.1021/es801626d. ISSN 0013-936X. PMID 19452904. Wikidata Q43765126.
- Selina M. Bamforth; David A.C. Manning; Ian Singleton; Paul L. Younger; Karen L. Johnson (August 2006). "Manganese removal from mine waters – investigating the occurrence and importance of manganese carbonates". Applied Geochemistry. 21 (8): 1274–1287. Bibcode:2006ApGC...21.1274B. doi:10.1016/j.apgeochem.2006.06.004. ISSN 0883-2927. Wikidata Q57219724.
- Catherine E Clarke; Filip Kielar; Helen M Talbot; Karen L Johnson (1 February 2010). "Oxidative decolorization of acid azo dyes by a Mn oxide containing waste". Environmental Science & Technology. 44 (3): 1116–1122. Bibcode:2010EnST...44.1116C. doi:10.1021/es902305e. ISSN 0013-936X. PMID 20070073. Wikidata Q43195793.
