= Wellcome Centre for Human Neuroimaging =

Laboratory of the University College London

The Wellcome Trust Centre for Neuroimaging at UCL
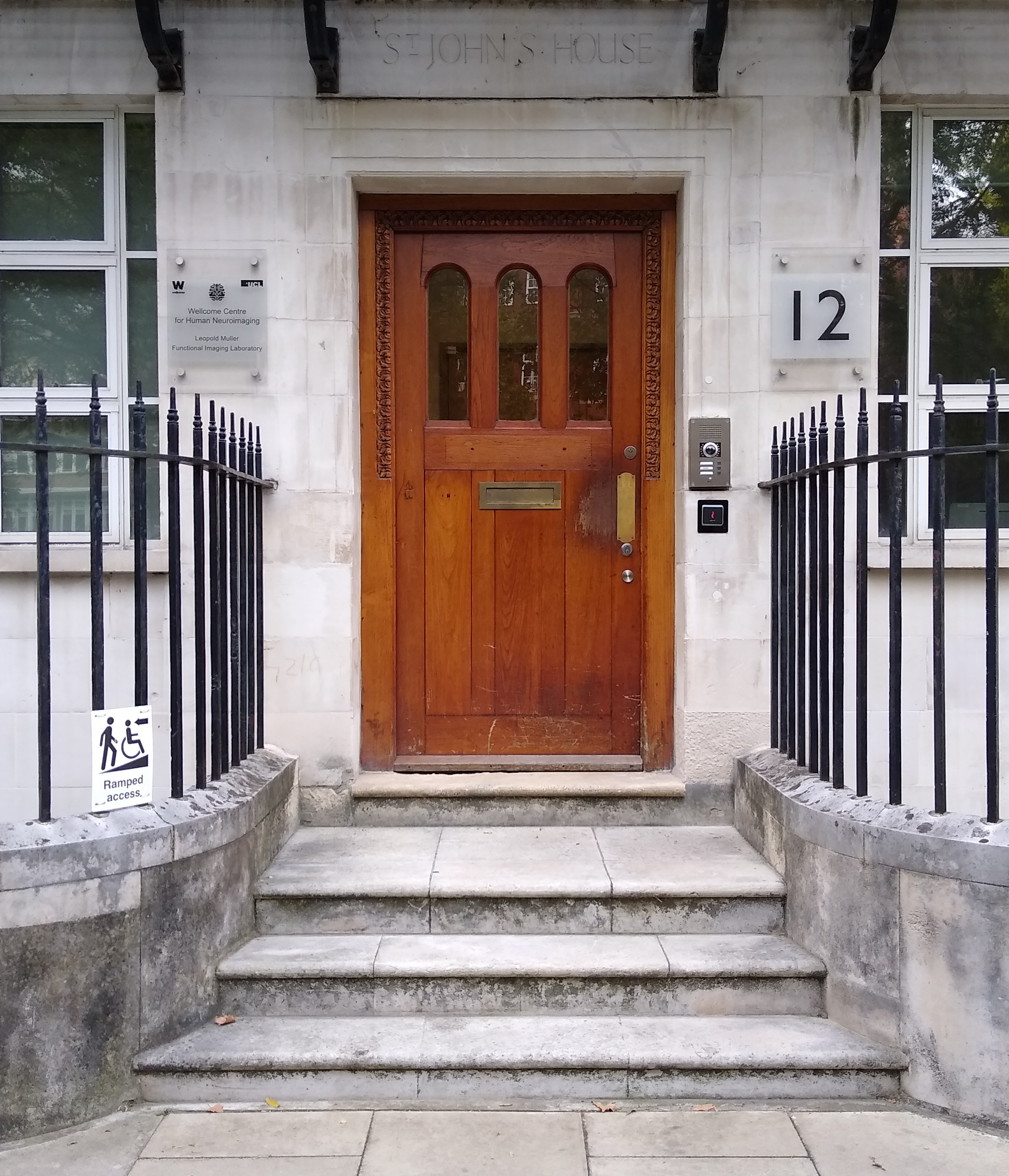
- Established: 2006
- Director: Martina Callaghan
- Location: London, United Kingdom; 51°31′18.2″N 0°7′22.4″W
- Website: Wellcome Trust Centre for Neuroimaging

The Wellcome Centre for Human Neuroimaging, formerly the Wellcome Trust Centre for Neuroimaging at University College London (incorporating the Leopold Muller Functional Imaging Laboratory and the Wellcome Department of Imaging Neuroscience) is an interdisciplinary centre for neuroimaging research based in London, United Kingdom.

Principal investigators working at the Centre include Professors Ray Dolan, Jon Driver, Richard Frackowiak, Chris Frith, Karl Friston, Eleanor Maguire, Cathy Price, and Geraint Rees. The Centre is located in Queen Square in the Bloomsbury area of Central London, adjacent to the National Hospital for Neurology and Neurosurgery.

== History ==
'The Functional Imaging Laboratory (FIL)', was founded in 1994 following a major grant award from the Wellcome Trust. This provided for a new building, capital equipment and core staff support. The award enabled a core group of scientists, based at the Medical Research Council Cyclotron Unit, at the Hammersmith Hospital to relocate their activity to a central London site, within UCL.

In 1994 the principal neuroimaging research tool was positron emission tomography (PET). Over the next decade functional magnetic resonance imaging (fMRI) became the primary investigative tool of the FIL, leading to PET decommissioning in 2004. Currently, the investigative tools of the laboratory include functional magnetic resonance imaging (fMRI) magneto-encephalography (MEG) and electro-encephalography (EEG). The laboratory has continued to enjoy core Wellcome Trust infrastructure support through major grant awards in 1999 and 2004.

In 2006, following a successful bid for a Strategic Award the laboratory was awarded Wellcome Trust Centre status, and is now known as the Wellcome Trust Centre for Neuroimaging at UCL.

== See also ==
- Statistical Parametric Mapping
