= Casper Hoogenraad =

Dutch biologist (born 1973)

- Born: January 31, 1973 (age 53); Delft, The Netherlands
- Citizenship: The Netherlands
- Education: Utrecht University; Erasmus University Rotterdam
- Known for: Molecular Neuroscience
- Scientific career
- Fields: Neuroscience
- Workplaces: Erasmus University; Massachusetts Institute of Technology; Utrecht University; Genentech
- Doctoral advisor: Frank Grosveld, Chris De Zeeuw
- Other academic advisors: Morgan Sheng
- Website: https://www.gene.com/scientists/our-scientists/casper-hoogenraad

Casper Hoogenraad is a Dutch cell biologist who specializes in molecular neuroscience. The focus of his research is the basic molecular and cellular mechanisms that regulate the development and function of the brain. As of January 2020, he serves as Vice President of Neuroscience at Genentech Research and Early Development.

== Biography and academic career ==
Casper Hoogenraad was born in 1973 in Delft and grew up in Gouda, in The Netherlands. He received his B.S. in Biochemistry and M.S. in Molecular Biology from Utrecht University, and his doctorate in Cell Biology from the Erasmus University Rotterdam. In 2002, Hoogenraad started his post-doctoral research at Massachusetts Institute of Technology in Cambridge, USA. In 2005, he returned to the Netherlands and joined the faculty of the Erasmus University Medical Center in Rotterdam as associate professor in the Department of Neuroscience. In 2011 he joined Utrecht University as full Professor of Molecular Neuroscience, and served as Chair of Cell Biology, Neurobiology and Biophysics for 10 years. He is adjunct professor in Department of Biochemistry and Biophysics at University of California, San Francisco (UCSF).

During his career, he discovered molecular mechanisms and cell biological processes that control cytoskeleton remodeling and cargo trafficking during the development and function of the brain. Hoogenraad published over 250 research articles, reviews and books, focused on synaptic function dendritic spine plasticity neuronal polarity organelle sorting mechanisms the axon initial segment cytoskeleton remodeling microtubule dynamics fundamental transport mechanisms axon regeneration and neurodegeneration. See for full publication record - Pubmed, Google Scholar, ORCID

== Industrial career ==
Hoogenraad was recruited to Genentech, a member of the Roche Group, as Senior Fellow and head of Neuroscience. As of January 2020, he is Vice President of Neuroscience at Genentech Research and Early Development. In this role, he is Head of the Neuroscience Department, responsible for research and drug discovery activities in Neuroscience and oversees Genentech's Neuroscience disease pipeline programs. He is also responsible for Translational Neuroscience, Neuroscience Stem Cell group, Department of Translational Imaging, and Department of Molecular Biology.

== Honors and awards ==
He is an elected member of the European Molecular Biology Organization, The Young Academy' of the Royal Netherlands Academy of Sciences, Young Academy of Europe and the Editorial Board of Neuron and The EMBO Journal. In 2016 he became the 10th recipient of the IBRO-Kemali Prize, in the field of basic and clinical Neuroscience. Some of his awards: NWO Talent stipendium, Human Frontiers Long-Term Fellowship, European Younng Investigators (EURYI) award, Dutch Innovational Research VIDI and VICI, European Research Council (ERC) - consolidator grant.

== Science outreach ==
In 2013, his laboratory made an animation movie, named 'A Day in the Life of a Motor Protein', which has received >1 million views on YouTube. During this short five-minute movie, we follow John, a motor protein, who has to transport a large package through the narrow streets in the city of Utrecht, illustrating the importance and challenges of intracellular transport.
