= Lucy Carpenter =

Professor of physical chemistry (born 1969)

Lucy Carpenter MBE FRS
- Born: Lucy Jane Carpenter; 21 October 1969 (age 57)
- Education: University of Bristol (BSc); University of East Anglia (PhD)
- Awards: Philip Leverhulme Prize 2006; Rosalind Franklin Award 2015; Tilden Prize 2017; Vilhelm Bjerknes Medal 2024
- Scientific career
- Fields: Atmospheric sciences; Ocean-air interactions; Halogens
- Workplaces: University of York
- Thesis: Measurements of peroxy radicals in clean and polluted atmospheres (1996)
- Doctoral advisor: Stuart Penkett
- Website: www.york.ac.uk/chemistry/staff/academic/a-c/lcarpenter/

Lucy Jane Carpenter (born 21 October 1969) is a British chemist who is a professor of physical chemistry at the University of York. She was one of the founding scientists and director of the Cape Verde Atmospheric Observatory (CVAO), established on São Vicente in 2006 and now a key global monitoring site. Her work has helped to transform understanding of how oceans shape the air above them.

== Education ==
Carpenter graduated with a BSc in chemistry from the University of Bristol in 1991 followed by a PhD in atmospheric chemistry at the University of East Anglia supervised by Stuart Penkett and awarded in 1996.

== Research and career ==
Her group studies the complex interaction between the oceans and the atmosphere, in particular the chemistry of reactive halogens, organic carbon, and reactive nitrogen. Her work on oceanic and atmospheric halogens has established this chemistry as an important component of tropospheric ozone cycling and makes use of gas chromatography–mass spectrometry (GCMS).

She helped establish the Cape Verde Atmospheric Observatory, one of a few dozen World Meteorological Organization (WMO) Global Atmosphere Watch (GAW) stations worldwide which monitor climate and air quality gases over long time scales, and was a lead chapter author of the WMO/United Nations Environment Programme (UNEP) 2014 scientific assessment of ozone depletion.

Carpenter is one of the co-chairs of the Scientific Assessment Panel for the Montreal Protocol and presented at the 37th Meeting of the Parties (MOP37) in Nairobi.

In March 2026, Carpenter was featured on The Life Scientific to speak about the impact of oceans on ozone.

== Awards and honours ==
Carpenter has received several awards for her research. She received a Philip Leverhulme Prize in 'Earth Ocean and Atmospheric Sciences' in 2006, and was given the Rosalind Franklin Award from the Royal Society in 2015 for "her scientific achievement, her suitability as a role model and her project proposal to promote women in STEM". She received the Tilden Prize in 2017. In 2019, Carpenter was elected a Fellow of the Royal Society (FRS). She was awarded the 2024 Vilhelm Bjerknes Medal "for establishing a critical link between the production of trace gases in and over the oceans, atmospheric chemistry, and climate change".

Carpenter was appointed Member of the Order of the British Empire (MBE) in the 2022 New Year Honours for services to atmospheric chemistry.
