= Nguyen TK Thanh =

Vietnamese nanotechnologist

Nguyen Thanh FRSC FInstP FRSB FIMMM
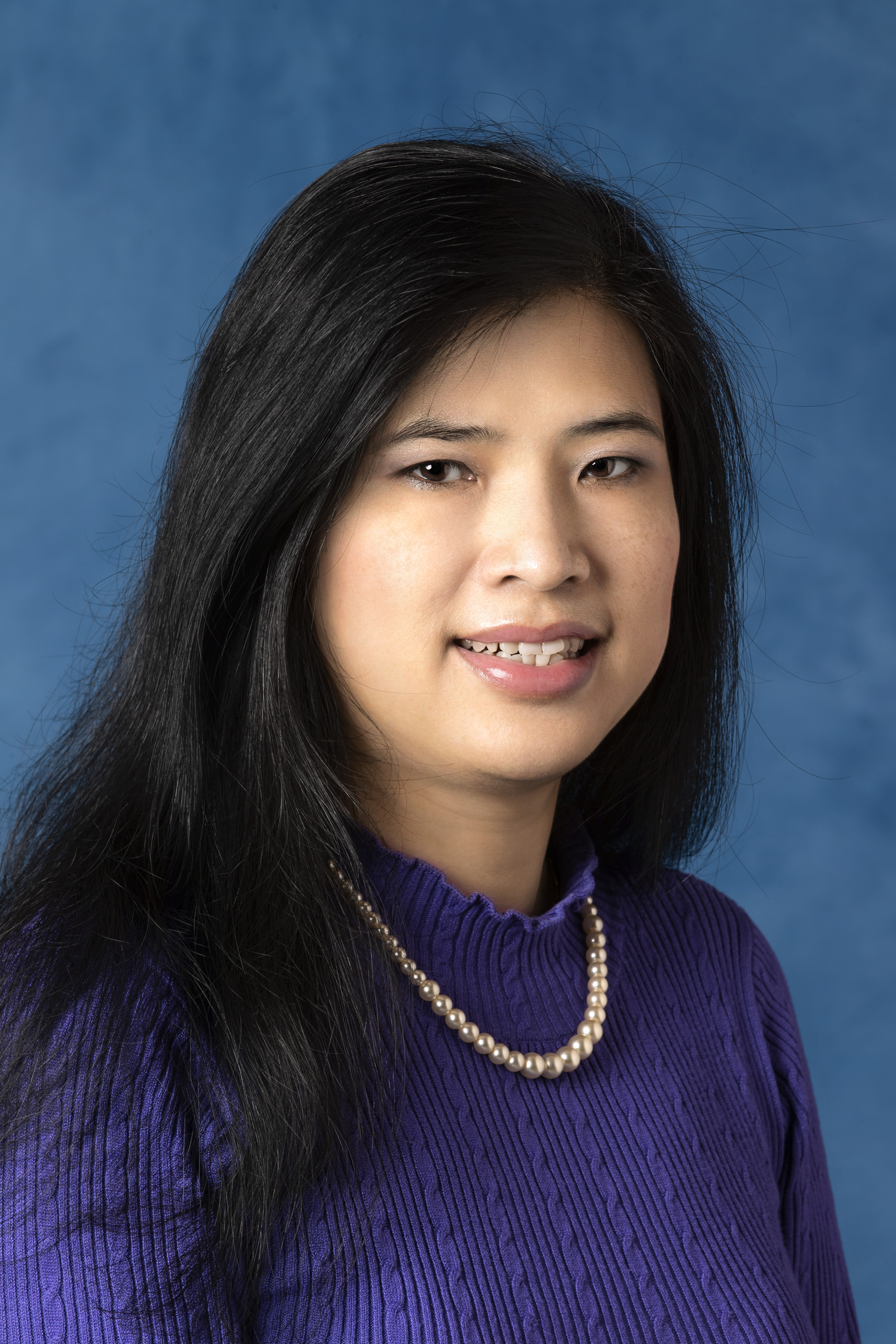
- Born: Nguyễn Thị Kim Thanh; Vietnam
- Education: Vietnam National University, Hanoi (BSc); University of Amsterdam (MSc); University of East London (PhD)
- Awards: Rosalind Franklin Award (2019); Royal Society University Research Fellowship (2005)
- Scientific career
- Fields: Nanoscience
- Workplaces: University of New Orleans; University of Liverpool; University College London
- Thesis: Renal lipid changes in response to chemical insults (1998)
- Website: www.ucl.ac.uk/~ucaptt0

Nguyễn Thị Kim Thanh FRSC FInstP FRSB FIMMM is a professor of Nanomaterials at University College London. She was awarded the 2019 Royal Society Rosalind Franklin Award for her research and efforts toward gender equality.

== Early life and education ==
Thanh grew up in Vietnam. She studied chemistry at the Vietnam National University, Hanoi, which she graduated in 1992. She was selected for the Netherlands organisation for international cooperation in higher education (NUFFIC) scheme and moved to the University of Amsterdam to begin a Master's program in chemistry. Thanh completed her master's degree in 1994, before being selected for a PhD program in biochemistry at the University of East London. During her PhD she developed new techniques to study the renal toxicity of N-Phenylanthranilic acid. To do this, she studied various types of lipids in rat kidneys and demonstrated that lipids are a viable non-invasive method to study renal papillary necrosis.

== Research and career ==
After her PhD, Thanh was a postdoctoral researcher at Aston University, where she worked on medicinal chemistry. She developed a technique that could be used to synthesise cell membrane permeable fluorescent versions of cyclic adenosine monophosphate (cAMP) and cyclic guanosine monophosphate (cGMP). Thanh moved to the University of New Orleans in 2001, where she began to work with nanotechnology. Here she developed nanoparticle sensors for biological assays. In particular, Thanh used gold nanoparticles combined with fluorescent sensors. She moved to the University of Liverpool in 2003, where she worked in the Centre for Nanoscience. Here she worked with glycosaminoglycan and tissue engineering. She was awarded a Royal Society University Research Fellowship and appointed a lecturer in 2005. She took part in the Royal Society parliamentary pairing scheme in 2007, and was paired with Andrew Miller, then Chair of the Science and Technology Select Committee.

In 2009 Thanh joined University College London as an associate professor of nanotechnology, where she is based in the Davy Faraday Laboratory. She studies nanomaterials and their applications in biomedicine, and has continued to investigate colloidal gold. She is particularly interested in magnetic nanoparticles and how they can be used to treat cancer.

=== Awards and honours ===
In 2010 she presented her work in nanoscience at the Royal Society Summer Exhibition. The project was selected by the New Scientist as one of the highlights of the show. Thanh is involved with the London Centre for Nanotechnology and was a co-founding member of the Global Young Academy. She has presented at the World Economic Forum, the Vietnam Young Academy and the European Commission. She was awarded the 2019 Rosalind Franklin Award from the Royal Society.

She is a Fellow of the Institute of Physics (FInstP), the Royal Society of Chemistry (FRSC), the Royal Society of Biology (FRSB) and the Institute of Materials, Minerals and Mining (FIMMM).

=== Selected publications ===
Her publications include:

- Magnetic Nanoparticles: From Fabrication to Clinical Applications
- Clinical Applications of Magnetic Nanoparticles: From Fabrication to Clinical Applications
- Determination of Size and Concentration of Gold Nanoparticles from UV−Vis Spectra
- Progress in applications of magnetic nanoparticles in biomedicine
