= Hailan Hu =

Chinese neuroscientist

Hu Hailan
- 胡海岚
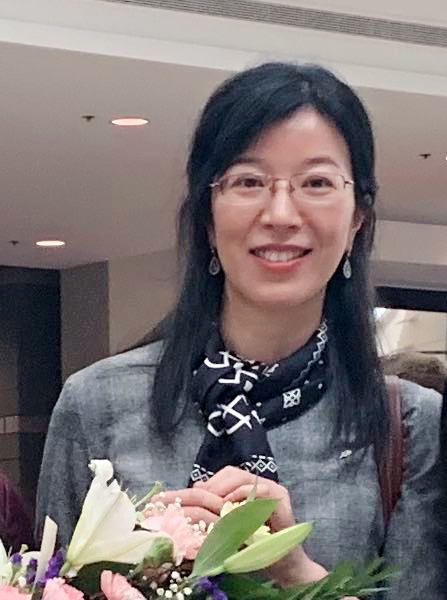
- Born: September 1973 (age 52); Hangzhou, Zhejiang, China
- Education: Peking University; University of California, Berkeley; Cold Spring Harbor Laboratory
- Known for: Neural circuits underlying social dominance, habenular neural circuits in depression
- Awards: 2019 IBRO-Kemali International Prize; 2016 Tan Jia Zhen Life Science Award; 2015 Chinese Young Female scientist Award; 2015 Changjiang Scholar Award; 2015 L'Oréal-UNESCO For Women in Science
- Scientific career
- Fields: Neuroscience
- Institutions: Zhejiang University School of Medicine

Hu Hailan (Chinese: 胡海岚; pinyin: Hú Hǎilán; born September 1973) is a Chinese neuroscientist, professor, and executive director of the Center for Neuroscience at Zhejiang University School of Medicine in Hangzhou, China. Hu explores neural mechanisms underlying social behaviors and psychiatric diseases. She specifically explores the neural substrates of social rank and the role of neuron-glia interactions in driving depressive behaviors. Hu discovered the anatomical and molecular targets of ketamine's fast-acting antidepressant effects to be localized to the lateral habenular circuits in rodents. Hu was also the first scientist outside of Europe and America to be awarded the IBRO-Kemali Prize in over 20 years. She is also a member of the Jiusan Society.

== Early life and education ==
Hu was born in Hangzhou, Zhejiang province with ancestral roots in Dongyang, Jinhua in September 1973. Hu pursued her undergraduate degree at Peking University in Beijing, China. In 1996, she received her Bachelors of Science in biochemistry and molecular biology.

Hu then moved to the United States to work as a research technician for one year at the University of California, San Francisco. She then pursued her graduate studies at the University of California, Berkeley. Under the mentorship of Corey S. Goodman, Hu explored the role of the plexin receptor and the Rho family GTPases in central nervous system development in Drosophila. Plexins are receptors involved in axon guidance, and Hu discovered a seven amino acid sequence in plexin, PlexB, which is necessary for Rac-GTP binding and subsequently axon guidance. Interestingly, PlexB inhibits Rac from binding downstream interactors while at the same time enhancing RhoA activity, altogether driving axon guidance. In further work, Hu found that CrossGAP, a GTPase-activating protein, is responsible for regulating Rac dependent-cytoskeletal changes during axon guidance in Drosophila. Hu completed her PhD in 2002.

Following her PhD, Hu pursued her postdoctoral work under the mentorship of Julius Zhu and Roberto Malinow at the University of Virginia. In 2004, Hu moved to the Cold Spring Harbor Laboratory and then to the University of California, San Diego in 2006, to continue working under the mentorship of Malinow. During her postdoc, Hu explored the role of AMPA receptor trafficking in emotional enhancement of memory formation as well as the role of Ras GTPase signalling in fragile X syndrome.

== Career and research ==
In 2008, Hu returned to China and joined the Chinese Academy of Sciences Institute of Neuroscience in Shanghai and became the principal investigator of the Hu Lab. Her lab has been focusing on the neural mechanisms of social dominance in mice as well as the neural mechanisms of depression and the antidepressant effects of ketamine. Her lab has pioneered techniques with which to probe the neural correlates of social rank. In 2015, Hu was recruited to become a professor and senior investigator at the QuiShi Academy for Advanced Studies within the Medical School of Zhejiang University in Hangzhou, China. Hu also became the executive director at the Center for Neuroscience at Zhejiang University School of Medicine. In November 2025, Hu was elected as an academician of the Chinese Academy of Sciences.

=== Neural circuit mechanisms of social dominance ===
Hu and her lab pioneered the study of neural circuit mechanisms governing social rank. In 2011, they showed that neurons in the medial prefrontal cortex of mice encode rank-specific information. Mice with higher social rank had increased strength of excitatory inputs in the layer IV pyramidal neurons of the mPFC compared to more subordinate mice. Further, manipulating the synaptic strength in the mPFC led to upward or downward movement in the social hierarchy, suggesting that these neurons are fundamental in the neural processes governing social rank.

Hu and her team subsequently explored the effects of winning a social competition on social neural circuits across dominance rank. They found that activating the dorsomedial prefrontal cortex (dmPFC) induces winning in social competitions. Specifically, the medial dorsal thalamic (MDT) inputs to the dmPFC, when stimulated, led to increased dominance behavior through increased initiations of competitions and more effortful behaviors. They propose that mPFC neural computations are fundamental in guiding dominance based behaviors, such as competition.

An important contribution that Hu and her team made to the field was the establishment of reliable tests to assess dominance rank in a hierarchy. They use a behavioral assay called the "tube test" to obtain information about a mouse's rank. This test involves two mice from a cage meeting head to head in a small tube. Since both mice cannot fit to pass each other in the tube, one mouse is pushed by the other. The winner of this social encounter is the mouse that pushes the other mouse out. The tube test is performed in a round-robin type fashion such that the mouse that wins the mouse encounters across several days and continues to win in a stable way is deemed the dominant mouse. The correlation between tube test wins and dominance allows a researcher to then probe the neural correlates of dominance or other biological phenomena in relation to dominance.

=== Neural and glial mechanisms of depression ===
Hu and her team study the neural circuit mechanisms driving depression in rodent models. They found in 2013 that the lateral habenula (LHb) circuits play a role in depression through neuronal adaptations associated with the enzyme BCamKII upregulation. Increases in BCamKII lead to increased excitatory synaptic transmission and action potential firing through increased expression of a specific subtype of glutamate receptors. Overall habenular hyperactivity was associated with depressive phenotypes.

In a following study, Hu and her team further explored the mechanisms of habenular hyperactivity. Using a proteomic analysis, they found evidence of upregulation of an astrocytic potassium channel, Kir4.1, in rat models of depression and the expression profiles of this channel seem to be localized to the synaptic junctions between astrocytes and neuronal somas. Hu found that these channels tightly regulate neuronal bursting and excitability of neurons in the LHb. By manipulating the expression levels of Kir4.1, Hu and her team showed that astrocytic Kir4.1 bidirectionally regulates the hyperexcitability of neurons as well as depressive behavioral symptoms highlighting the role of glia-neuron interactions in psychiatric illnesses such as depression.

Hu and her colleagues then explored the potential of using ketamine to target the burst firing/hyperactivity in lateral habenula neurons that was leading to depressive phenotypes. Ketamine has been previously shown to be effective as a rapid antidepressant, yet the mechanisms of action have not yet been completely elucidated. They showed that blocking the NMDAR-dependent burst firing in the LHb, through ketamine administration, is able to alleviate symptoms of depression in rodent models. The blocking of LHb hyperactivity appears to disinhibit downstream monoaminergic reward centers thereby exerting antidepressant effects on habenular circuitry.

== Awards and honors ==
- 2025 Chinese Academy of Sciences Member, Chinese Academy of Sciences
- 2023 Asian Scientist 100, Asian Scientist
- 2022 L’Oréal-UNESCO For Women in Science International Awards
- 2019 Prize for Scientific and Technological Progress Ho Leung Ho Lee Foundation
- 2019 IBRO-Kemali International Prize for research in basic and clinical neurosciences
- 2016 Tan Jia Zhen Life Science Award
- 2015 Chinese Young Female scientist Award
- 2015 Chang Jiang Scholar Award
- 2015 L'Oréal-UNESCO For Women in Science
- 2013 Meiji Life Science Outstanding Award
- 2012 Chinese Outstanding Youth Award
- 2012 and 2014 Excellent Mentorship Award of Chinese Academy of Sciences
- 2010-2012 Shanghai Pujiang Talent Award
- 2009-2012 Chinese Hundred Talent Plan Award
- 2003-2006 Damon Runyon Foundation Postdoctoral Fellowship
- 2002 HHMI and IBRO fellowships for MBL Neurobiology Course
- 1998-2003 Howard Hughes Medical Institute Predoctoral Fellowship

== Select publications ==
- Hu H, Cui Y, Yang Y. Circuits and functions of the lateral habenula in health and in disease. Nature Reviews. Neuroscience. 2020 PMID 32269316 DOI: 10.1038/s41583-020-0292-4
- Gao Z, Hu H. Star-like cells spark behavioural hyperactivity in mice. Nature. 2019 571: 43–44. PMID 31263260 DOI: 10.1038/d41586-019-01949-2
- Cui Y, Hu S, Hu H. Lateral Habenular Burst Firing as a Target of the Rapid Antidepressant Effects of Ketamine. Trends in Neurosciences. 2019 42: 179–191. PMID 30823984 DOI: 10.1016/j.tins.2018.12.002
- Fan Z, Zhu H, Zhou T, Wang S, Wu Y, Hu H. Using the tube test to measure social hierarchy in mice. Nature Protocols. 2019 PMID 30770887 DOI: 10.1038/s41596-018-0116-4
- Cui Y, Yang Y, Dong Y, Hu H. Decoding Depression: Insights from Glial and Ketamine Regulation of Neuronal Burst Firing in Lateral Habenula. Cold Spring Harbor Symposia On Quantitative Biology. PMID 30718267 DOI: 10.1101/sqb.2018.83.036871
- Yang Y, Cui Y, Sang K, Dong Y, Ni Z, Ma S, Hu H. Ketamine blocks bursting in the lateral habenula to rapidly relieve depression. Nature. 2018 554: 317–322. PMID 29446381 DOI: 10.1038/nature25509
- Cui Y, Yang Y, Ni Z, Dong Y, Cai G, Foncelle A, Ma S, Sang K, Tang S, Li Y, Shen Y, Berry H, Wu S, Hu H. Astroglial Kir4.1 in the lateral habenula drives neuronal bursts in depression. Nature. 2018 554: 323–327. PMID 29446379 DOI: 10.1038/nature25752
- Zhou T, Zhu H, Fan Z, Wang F, Chen Y, Liang H, Yang Z, Zhang L, Lin L, Zhan Y, Wang Z, Hu H. History of winning remodels thalamo-PFC circuit to reinforce social dominance. Science 2017 (New York, N.Y.). 357: 162–168. PMID 28706064 DOI: 10.1126/science.aak9726
- Wang F, Zhu J, Zhu H, Zhang Q, Lin Z, Hu H. Bidirectional control of social hierarchy by synaptic efficacy in medial prefrontal cortex. Science 2011 (New York, N.Y.). 334: 693–7. PMID 21960531 DOI: 10.1126/science.1209951
- Hu H, Qin Y, Bochorishvili G, Zhu Y, van Aelst L, Zhu JJ. Ras signaling mechanisms underlying impaired GluR1-dependent plasticity associated with fragile X syndrome. The Journal of Neuroscience : the Official Journal of the Society For Neuroscience. 2008 28: 7847–62. PMID 18667617 DOI: 10.1523/JNEUROSCI.1496-08.2008
- Hu H, Real E, Takamiya K, Kang MG, Ledoux J, Huganir RL, Malinow R. Emotion enhances learning via norepinephrine regulation of AMPA-receptor trafficking. Cell. 2007 131: 160–73. PMID 17923095 DOI: 10.1016/j.cell.2007.09.017
- Hu H, Marton TF, Goodman CS. Plexin B mediates axon guidance in Drosophila by simultaneously inhibiting active Rac and enhancing RhoA signaling. Neuron. 2001 32: 39–51. PMID 11604137 DOI: 10.1016/S0896-6273(01)00453-6
