= Patrik Verstreken =

Belgian neuroscientist

- Education: Baylor College of Medicine
- Scientific career
- Fields: Neuroscience
- Workplaces: KU Leuven; VIB

Patrik Verstreken is a Belgian neuroscientist, highly cited in his field. His work is focused on the function of neuronal synapses during health and neurological disease. Major contributions include identifying molecular mechanisms by which neurodegenerative diseases such as Alzheimer's disease spread throughout the brain and identification of new defects causing Parkinson's disease.

Verstreken obtained his degree in bio-engineering from the University of Brussels in 1998. He joined the graduate school of biomedical sciences at Baylor College of Medicine and under the mentorship of Hugo Bellen, he obtained a PhD in developmental biology in 2003.

After post-doctoral training and with support of a Marie Curie Excellence grant he became a group leader at Vlaams Instituut voor Biotechnologie and joined the faculty of the University of Leuven (KU Leuven) in 2007, at the Center for Human Genetics. In 2016 he became the director of the Vlaams Instituut voor Biotechnologie-KU Leuven Center for Brain & Disease Research. He obtained an ERC starting grant in 2011 and an ERC consolidator grant in 2015.

== Research ==
Patrik Verstreken has made contributions to the understanding of synaptic function in health and neurodegenerative disease. Using fruit flies and more recently also human neurons derived from embryonic stem cells, the work in his lab has focused on key proteins, lipids and mitochondria that regulate synaptic activity and how these molecules and organelles are misregulated in Parkinson's disease.

This has led to the discovery of specific presynaptic and organellar defects in Parkinson's disease and epilepsy, and in strategies as to how these defects can be suppressed.

Verstreken's lab uses the fruit fly (Drosophila melanogaster) as a model system to study neuronal communication. He has advocated for animal research in the field and neuroscience, and in particular the value of the fruit fly as a model for biomedical research.

== Awards ==
In 2014, Verstreken was awarded the IBRO-Kemali Prize for Research in recognition of his work on neurodegenerative diseases.

He became an EMBO member on 14 May 2018.
