= Gül Dölen =

Turkish-American neuroscientist

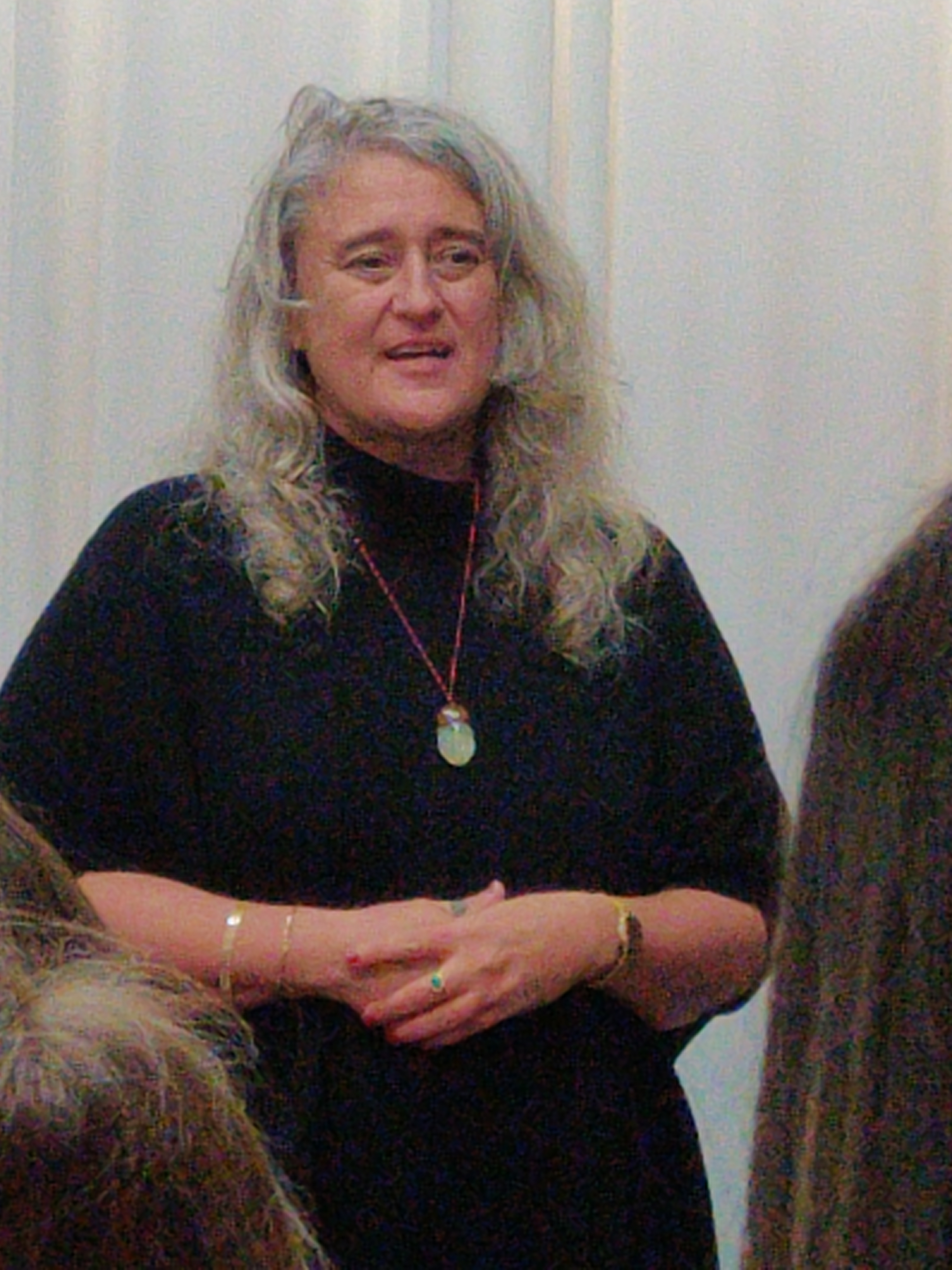
- Gül Dölen speaking at Shulgin Farm
- Education: Brown University; Massachusetts Institute of Technology
- Scientific career
- Fields: Neuroscience
- Workplaces: Johns Hopkins University; University of California, Berkeley
- Website: https://neuroscience.jhu.edu/research/faculty/23

Gül Dölen is a Turkish-American neuroscientist known for studying social behavior, psychedelic drugs, and critical periods.

As an MD–PhD student at Brown University and later at Massachusetts Institute of Technology, Dölen studied fragile X syndrome and identified a possible treatment target.

As a postdoctoral fellow under Robert Malenka, Dölen found that the hormones oxytocin and serotonin interact with the brain's nucleus accumbens to produce good feelings from social interactions ("social rewards") in mice.

In 2018, Dölen co-authored a paper that found that octopuses, which are normally anti-social, became more social after exposure to the psychoactive drug MDMA, which acts on a serotonin pathway The research suggests that there is a common genetic basis of social behavior across much of the animal kingdom.

Dölen's recent research, published 2019–2023 in the journal Nature, examines the power of psychedelic drugs like MDMA in re-opening the critical period in social reward learning. A central implication of Dölen's 2023 Nature paper is that the duration of the reopened critical period in mice extends well beyond the acute pharmacological effects of each substance, for example, approximately 48 hours for ketamine and three weeks for LSD. In subsequent interviews and lectures, Dölen has argued that this post-acute window represents an underutilized therapeutic opportunity, comparing it to recovery after major surgery and suggesting that integration support during this period should receive greater clinical attention.

== Selected publications ==
- Gül Dölen; Ayeh Darvishzadeh; Kee Wui Huang; Robert C Malenka (2013). "Social reward requires coordinated activity of nucleus accumbens oxytocin and serotonin". Nature. 501 (7466): 179–184. doi:10.1038/nature12518. PMC 4091761. PMID 24025838. Wikidata Q33881046.
- Eric Edsinger; Gül Dölen (2018). "A Conserved Role for Serotonergic Neurotransmission in Mediating Social Behavior in Octopus". Current Biology. 28 (19): 3136-3142.e4. doi:10.1016/j.cub.2018.07.061. PMID 30245101. Wikidata Q57294023.
- Romain Nardou; Eastman M Lewis; Rebecca Rothhaas; Ran Xu; Aimei Yang; Boyden, Edward; Gül Dölen (2019). "Oxytocin-dependent reopening of a social reward learning critical period with MDMA". Nature. 569 (7754): 116–120. doi:10.1038/s41586-019-1075-9. PMID 30944474. Wikidata Q64941735.
- Edward Sawyer; Young Jun Song; Mackenzie Wilkinson; et al. (2023). "Psychedelics reopen the social reward learning critical period". Nature. 618: 790–798. ISSN 1476-4687. Wikidata Q121425859.

== See also ==
- Critical period
- MDMA
