= IBRO-Kemali Prize =

Award in the field of Neurosciences

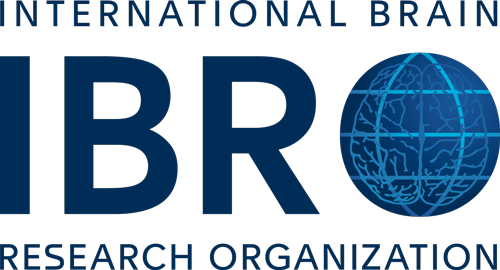

The IBRO Dargut and Milena Kemali International Prize for Research in the field of Basic and Clinical Neurosciences' is a prize awarded every two years to an outstanding researcher, under 45 years old, who made important contributions in the field of Basic and Clinical Neurosciences. The award was established in 1998.

The prize award equals 25,000 Euros, and the prize winner is invited to give a lecture at the Federation of European Neuroscience Societies (FENS) Forum of Neuroscience held every two year. According to the FENS regulations, speakers from the previous FENS Forum cannot be speakers at the next FENS Forum. Nominations should be submitted in electronic format and are evaluated by the Prize Committee of the IBRO Dargut & Milena Kemali Foundation.

== Prize winners ==
- 2022 – Sergiu P. Pasca (Romania, USA) – for his innovative research work using stem cell technology to create human brain organoids and assembloids, and their application to realistic studies of cellular mechanisms of human brain development and disease mechanisms.
- 2020 - Hailan Hu (Zheijiang, China) – for impressive work on the fundamental neurobiological mechanisms of emotional and affective behaviors.
- 2018 - Guillermina López-Bendito (Alicante, Spain) - for outstanding work on mechanisms of axon guidance in brain development, and in particular in thalamocortical connectivity.
- 2016 - Casper Hoogenraad (Utrecht, The Netherlands) - for outstanding work on cytoskeleton dynamics and intracellular transport in neural development and synaptic plasticity.
- 2014 - Patrik Verstreken (Leuven, Belgium) - for success in undoing the effect of one of the genetic defects that leads to Parkinson's using vitamin K2.
- 2012 - Eleanor Maguire (London, UK) - for innovative contributions to understanding human memory.
- 2010 - Jonas Frisén (Stockholm, Sweden) - for pioneering contributions to understanding of neurogenesis in the central nervous system.
- 2008 - Massimo Scanziani (San Diego, CA, USA) - for seminal discoveries on how cerebral cortex perceives the environment by showing that cortical circuits operate in an activity-dependent and non-linear fashion using canonical feed-forward and feed-back inhibition circuits as feature detectors of incoming stimuli.
- 2006 - Patrik Ernfors (Stockholm, Sweden) - for outstanding work on the expression and function of neurotrophic factors and neuropeptide and their receptors exploiting transgenic techniques.
- 2004 - Cornelia I. Bargmann (San Francisco, CA, USA) for fundamental discoveries concerning genes, behavior, and the sense of smell in the nematode C. elegans.
- 2002 - Daniele Piomelli (Irvine, CA, USA) for fundamental discoveries concerning the functional roles and regulation of endogenous cannabinoids in the brain and peripheral tissues.
- 2000 - Robert C. Malenka (Boston, MA, USA) - for fundamental contributions in the field of synaptic plasticity, in particular long term potentiation and long term depression, and the characterization of the role of silent synapses in these processes.
- 1998 - Tamas Freund (Budapest, Hungary) - for outstanding contributions to the organization and chemical characterization of identified neuronal circuits and cell types in the brain, in particular in the hippocampus.
