= Diane Saunders =

British biologist and academic

Diane Saunders OBE
- Born: Diane Gail Owen Saunders
- Education: University of Exeter (BSc, PhD)
- Awards: Rosalind Franklin Award (2022)
- Scientific career
- Workplaces: Sainsbury Laboratory; John Innes Centre; University of East Anglia
- Thesis: Cell-cycle mediated control of infection-related morphogenesis by the rice blast fungus, Magnaporthe oryzae (2009)
- Website: www.jic.ac.uk/people/diane-saunders/

Diane Gail Owen Saunders OBE is a British biologist and group leader at the John Innes Centre and an Honorary Professor in the School of Biological Sciences at the University of East Anglia. Her research investigates plant pathogens that pose a threat to agriculture. She was awarded the Rosalind Franklin Award by the Royal Society in 2022.

== Early life and education ==
Saunders received a first class honours degree in Biology from the University of Exeter. She then went on to obtain her PhD in cell biology and molecular genetics also at the University of Exeter in 2009. Her PhD research investigated infection-related morphogenesis caused by a rice blast fungus, Magnaporthe oryzae.

== Research and career ==
After her PhD, Saunders worked as a postdoctoral researcher at the Sainsbury Laboratory. In 2014, Saunders launched her own research group at the John Innes Centre. She investigates pathogens that significantly threaten agricultural production and food security. Saunders has focused on Puccinia, which cause wheat rust. In particular, she has studied Puccinia striiformis f. sp. tritici. She uses genomics-based approaches to monitor the dispersal of pathogens at an international scale. She developed "field pathogenomics", a surveillance technique that can analyse diversity in pathogen populations from field samples.

In 2018, Saunders published the identification of wheat stem rust in the UK for the first time in sixty years. This devastating disease has been associated with crop failure throughout history, although in the UK the last epidemic occurred in 1955. Saunders' observation triggered an international investigation, and identified that the UK strain belonged to the Digalu race.

Saunders has worked with the International Maize and Wheat Improvement Center (CIMMYT) and the Ethiopian Institute of Agricultural Research to create a platform that enables the diagnosis of plant diseases in realtime. The platform, Mobile And Real-time PLant disEase (MARPLE), seeks to monitor the spread of wheat yellow rust in Ethiopia and provide insight that can guide disease management responses. She subsequently launched the programme in Nepal and Kenya. When wheat strains diversify they can infect more rust-resistant varieties. As such, there is an urgent need to identify and monitor specific strains in real time. As part of delivering this programme, Saunders offers training courses for plant pathologists.

=== Selected publications ===
Her publications include:

- "Effector biology of plant-associated organisms: concepts and perspectives"
- "Emergence of wheat blast in Bangladesh was caused by a South American lineage of Magnaporthe oryzae"
- "Single nucleus genome sequencing reveals high similarity among nuclei of an endomycorrhizal fungus"

=== Awards and honours ===
In 2019, Saunders launched "Women in Wheat", a training programme to support women scientists working in wheat research. In 2022, she was awarded the Rosalind Franklin Award and Lecture for her "innovative mentoring and training project to support and empower undergraduates and early-career female researchers in plant sciences at postgraduate and postdoctoral levels". In 2024, she was appointed Officer of the Order of the British Empire (OBE) in the King's Birthday Honours for her contributions to plant science, agriculture, and the advancement of women in STEM.

- 2019 Biotechnology and Biological Sciences Research Council Innovator of the Year in the international category
- 2022 Royal Society Rosalind Franklin Award
- 2024 King's Birthday Honours
