= Rachel McKendry =

British chemist and digital public health pioneer

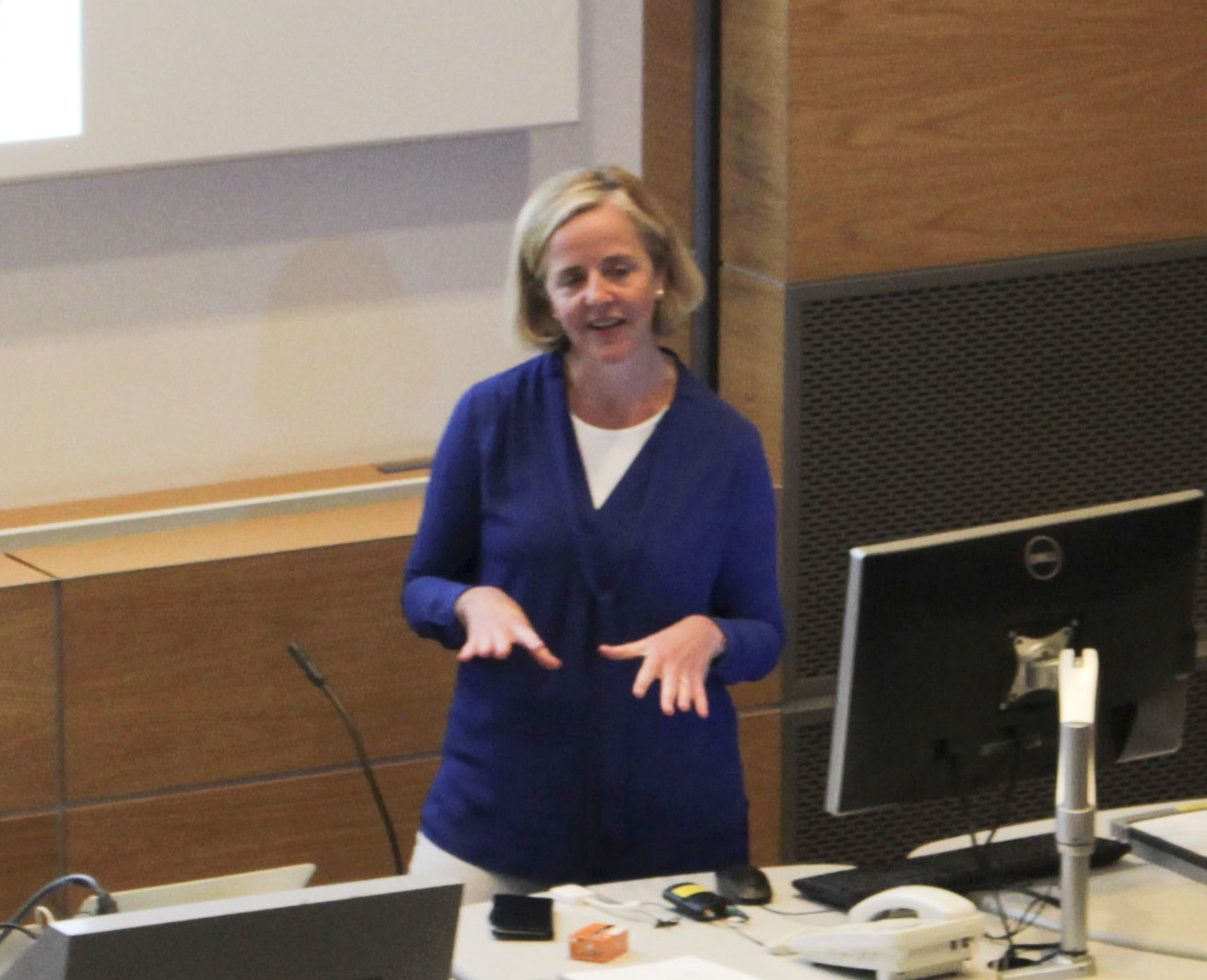
- Rachel McKendry in September 2016
- Born: Rachel Anne McKendry
- Education: Durham University (BSc); University of Cambridge (PhD)
- Awards: Royal Society Wolfson Research Merit Award (2014); Rosalind Franklin Award (2014)
- Scientific career
- Workplaces: University College London
- Thesis: Chemical force microscopy (1999)
- Academic advisors: Trevor Rayment and Chris Abell
- Website: iris.ucl.ac.uk/iris/browse/profile?upi=RMCKE57

Rachel Anne McKendry is a British chemist. She is Director of i-sense, a UK-based interdisciplinary research collaboration developing early warning sensing systems for infectious diseases, and was part of the UK's Cross Council Initiative on Antimicrobial Resistance. McKendry is also Professor of Biomedical Nanoscience at University College London, holding a joint appointment in the Division of Medicine and the London Centre for Nanotechnology.

== Early life and education ==
McKendry studied chemistry at Durham University (Trevelyan College), graduating in 1994. She was awarded a PhD from the University of Cambridge in 1999 and won a Girton College, Cambridge Research Fellowship in 1998.

== Career and research ==
After working as a postdoctoral researcher at the IBM Zurich Research Laboratory, McKendry returned to the UK to take up a Royal Society Dorothy Hodgkin Research Fellowship, and to work at University College London.

McKendry leads an interdisciplinary research team at the intersection of nanotechnology, telecommunications, big data, infectious diseases and public health. In 2015, she presented a Tedx Talk in Exeter on "The Digital Future of Public Health", in which she discussed early warning systems for disease outbreaks – from SARS to Ebola – being developed along the lines of Google Flu Trends, based on anonymised social media chatter from the world's many billion users of smartphones and other digital devices.

She has published many research papers in Nature, Nature Nanotechnology, Nature Materials and Proceedings of the National Academy of Sciences USA.

Recent research highlights include nanodiamond quantum materials for ultra-sensitive virus detection, cantilever nanosensors for phenotypic detection of antimicrobial resistance, and deep learning to support quality assurance and decision support of rapid field-based tests. McKendry also led a review of digital technologies in the global public health response to COVID-19.

=== i-Sense EPSRC IRC ===
McKendry is Director of i-Sense, a large interdisciplinary research collaboration set up in 2013 to develop early warning sensing systems for infectious diseases, and funded by the Engineering and Physical Sciences Research Council with a total investment of £11 million (renewed from 2018).

=== Membership of panels ===
- On the Steering Group of the Infectious Diseases Research Network, a mainly UK-based collaborative research project which ran between 2002 and 2015 and sought to reduce the toll of infectious diseases on the NHS, especially tuberculosis, health care associated infection, antimicrobial resistance, hepatitis, and sexually transmitted infections.
- Part of the UK Government's Blackett Review panel on Biological Detection which published its report in February 2014, identifying a number of technologies and capabilities that could improve government's ability to detect and respond to an airborne biological attack or infectious disease outbreak.
- Formerly an expert to the UK Prime Minister's Council for Science and Technology.
- Co-chaired the Digital Medicine Theme of the Topol Review of the NHS, which published 'Preparing the Healthcare Workforce to Deliver the Digital Future' in 2019.

== Awards and honours ==
In 2009, McKendry was awarded the Institute of Physics Clifford Paterson Medal and Prize.

In 2014, she received a Royal Society Wolfson Research Merit Award, to assist her study of 'New Paradigms in Connected Global Health for Infectious Diseases.'

In 2014, she received a Royal Society Rosalind Franklin Award for her "scientific achievements, her suitability as a role model and for her exciting proposal to launch a national competition to create mobile phone apps to inspire women to become leaders in science, technology, engineering and mathematics (STEM)".
