= Sarah-Jayne Blakemore =

British neuroscientist

Sarah-Jayne Blakemore FRS FBA FMedSci FRSB CPsychol
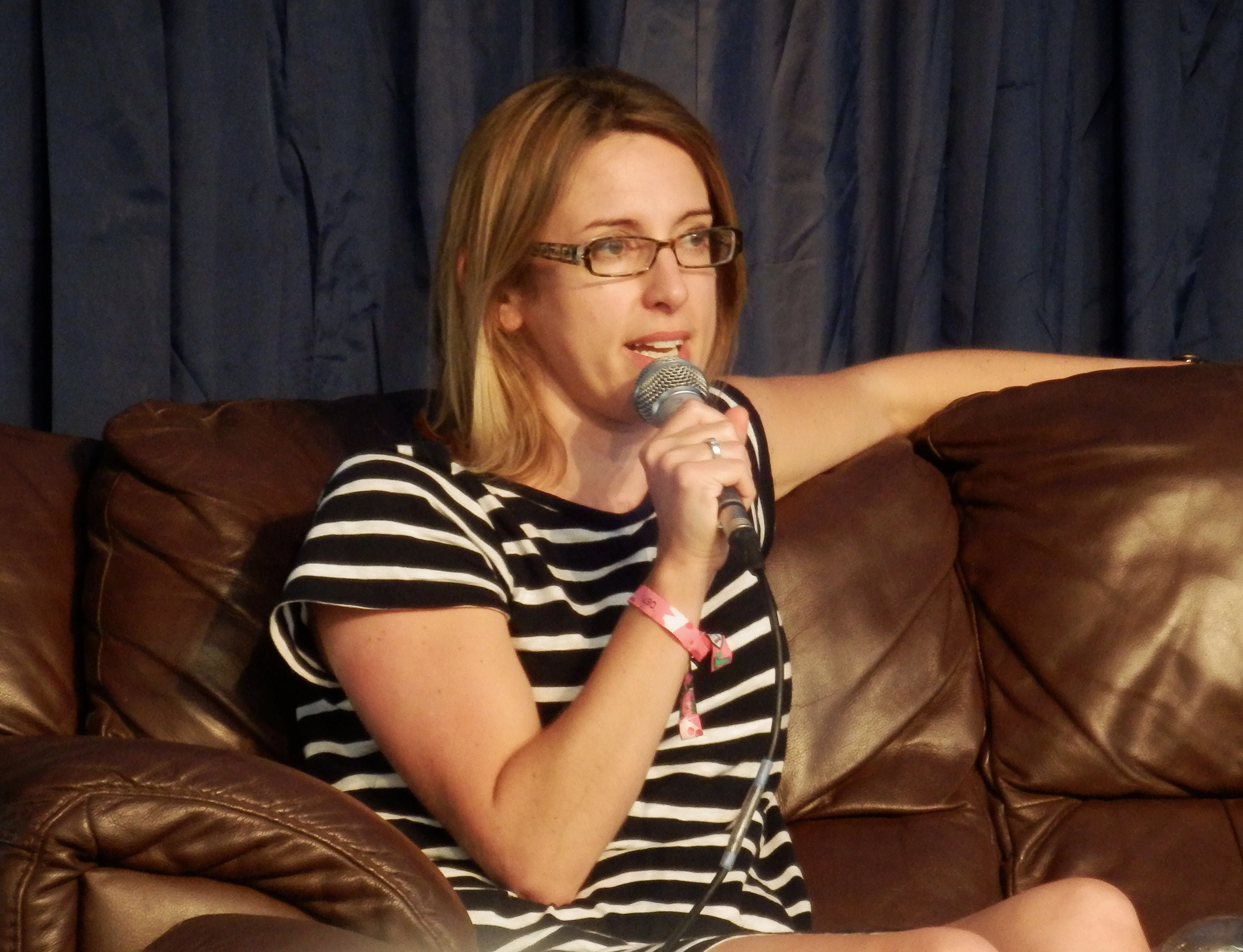
- Blakemore in 2015
- Born: 11 August 1974 (age 52); Cambridge, England
- Education: Oxford High School, England; University of Oxford (MA); University College London (PhD)
- Children: 2
- Awards: Royal Society University Research Fellowship (2006); Suffrage Science award (2011); Rosalind Franklin Award (2013)
- Scientific career
- Fields: Adolescent brain development; Social cognition; Cognitive control; Decision-making
- Workplaces: University of Cambridge; University College London
- Thesis: Recognising the sensory consequences of one's own actions (2000)
- Doctoral advisor: Chris Frith; Daniel Wolpert
- Website: sites.google.com/site/blakemorelab/

Sarah-Jayne Blakemore (born 11 August 1974) is a British neuroscientist who is professor of psychology and cognitive neuroscience at the University of Cambridge.

== Education ==
Blakemore was born in Cambridge and privately educated at Oxford High School, England and the University of Oxford where she was an undergraduate student at St John's College. She graduated with a congratulatory first class Bachelor of Arts degree in experimental psychology in 1996. She completed postgraduate study at University College London where she was awarded a PhD in 2000 for research co-supervised by Daniel Wolpert and Chris Frith. During her PhD, she was a Parliamentary Office of Science and Technology Fellow at the UK Parliament.

== Research and career ==
After her PhD, she was appointed an international postdoctoral research fellow from 2001 to 2003 to work in Lyon, France, with Jean Decety on the perception of causality in the human brain. This was followed by a Royal Society Dorothy Hodgkin Fellowship (2004–2007) and then a Royal Society University Research Fellowship (2007–2013) at UCL. She is actively involved in increasing the public awareness of science, frequently gives public lectures and talks at schools and acted as scientific consultant on the BBC series The Human Mind in 2003. Blakemore has an interest in the links between neuroscience and education and co-wrote a book with Uta Frith on The Learning Brain: Lessons for Education. She co-directed the Wellcome Trust four-year PhD programme in Neuroscience at UCL and was founding editor-in-Chief of the journal Developmental Cognitive Neuroscience.

Blakemore's research covers the development of social cognition and decision-making during human adolescence. She served on the Royal Society BrainWaves working group for neuroscience and vision committee for mathematics education and science education.

=== Awards and honours ===
Blakemore won the Rosalind Franklin Award in 2013 and the Klaus J. Jacobs Research Prize in 2015. Blakemore held a Royal Society University Research Fellowship from 2007 to 2013. In March 2015 Blakemore was interviewed by Jim Al-Khalili on BBC Radio 4's The Life Scientific. She was awarded Humanists UK's Rosalind Franklin lectureship in 2017.

In July 2018 Blakemore was elected Fellow of the British Academy (FBA). In 2020 Blakemore was elected an Honorary Fellow at St John's College, Oxford. The British Psychological Society awarded Blakemore the Presidents' Award for Distinguished Contributions to Psychological Knowledge in August 2018 which provides a lifetime membership to the Society. Blakemore was the winner of the 2018 Royal Society Prize for Science Books for her book Inventing Ourselves: The Secret Life of the Teenage Brain. She won Suffrage Science award in 2011. She was elected a Fellow of the Academy of Medical Sciences (FMedSci) in 2022. She was elected a Fellow of the Royal Society (FRS) in 2024. She was elected as an International Honorary Fellow of the American Academy of Arts and Sciences in 2026.

== Personal life ==
Blakemore is the daughter of Colin Blakemore and Andrée Blakemore (née Washbourne). She has two sons.

In 2024, she wrote in The Times about assisted dying and her father's experience with his terminal illness.
