= Martina Callaghan =

Irish medical physicist

Martina F. Callaghan
- Education: University of Limerick; Imperial College London
- Scientific career
- Workplaces: Wellcome Centre for Human Neuroimaging
- Thesis: Padé methods for image reconstruction and feature extraction in MRI (2005)

Martina F. Callaghan is an Irish medical physicist who is the Director of the Wellcome Centre for Human Neuroimaging at the UCL Queen Square Institute of Neurology. Her research considers the development of in-vivo histology using MRI.

== Early life and education ==
Callaghan studied physics at the University of Limerick. She moved to Imperial College London for her graduate research, where she joined Joseph Hajnal and David Larkman at Hammersmith Hospital and earned her Ph.D. Her research considered image reconstruction using under-sampled datasets. She worked as a postdoctoral researcher at Imperial College London and Middlesex University, focusing on parallel transmit technology, lipid quantification in clinical populations and the use of nanotechnology in oncology.

== Research and career ==
Callaghan joined the Wellcome Centre for Human Neuroimaging in 2012. She was promoted to Deputy Head of Physics in 2013, and became Deputy Head of the Physics Group in 2013. In 2016 she was appointed Head of Physics. In 2019 she became Deputy Centre Director and in 2020 was promoted to Professor of MRI Physics.

Callaghan was responsible for the launch of 7T MRI at University College London. Her research considers advanced, microstructure brain imaging as a means to understand the structure and function of brains. She makes use of quantitative imaging to understand tissue microstructure through measurements of iron levels and myelination. In particular, 7T MRI offers hope to interrogate the neural circuitry that is involved with human cognition. She is interested in inter-individual ageing and in-vivo histology using MRI.

In 2022, Callaghan was appointed Director of the Wellcome Centre for Human Neuroimaging.

== Selected publications ==
- Kirstie J Whitaker; Petra E Vértes; Rafael Romero-Garcia; et al. (25 July 2016). "Adolescence is associated with genomically patterned consolidation of the hubs of the human brain connectome". Proceedings of the National Academy of Sciences of the United States of America. 113 (32): 9105–9110. doi:10.1073/pnas.1601745113. ISSN 0027-8424. PMC 4987797. PMID 27457931. Wikidata Q37181845.
- Martina F Callaghan; Patrick Freund; Bogdan Draganski; et al. (15 February 2014). "Widespread age-related differences in the human brain microstructure revealed by quantitative magnetic resonance imaging". Neurobiology of Aging. 35 (8): 1862–1872. doi:10.1016/j.neurobiolaging.2014.02.008. ISSN 0197-4580. PMC 4024196. PMID 24656835. Wikidata Q30783478.
- Nikolaus Weiskopf; Siawoosh Mohammadi; Antoine Lutti; Martina F Callaghan (1 August 2015). "Advances in MRI-based computational neuroanatomy: from morphometry to in-vivo histology". Current Opinion in Neurology. 28 (4): 313–322. doi:10.1097/wco.0000000000000222. ISSN 1350-7540. PMID 26132532. Wikidata Q30978077.
