= Rosalind Franklin Award =

Annual British award for female scientists

- Awarded for: support the promotion of women in science, technology, engineering, and mathematics
- Sponsored by: Royal Society
- Date: 2003
- Location: London
- Country: United Kingdom
- Presented by: Department for Innovation, Universities and Skills
- Reward: £30,000
- Website: royalsociety.org/grants-schemes-awards/awards/rosalind-franklin-award/

The Royal Society Rosalind Franklin Award was established in 2003 and is awarded annually by the Royal Society to an individual for outstanding work in any field of Science, technology, engineering, and mathematics (STEM) and to support the promotion of women in STEM. It is named in honour of Rosalind Franklin and initially funded by the Department of Trade and Industry (DTI) and subsequently the Department for Innovation, Universities and Skills (DIUS) as part of its efforts to promote women in STEM. Women are a significantly underrepresented group in STEM making up less than 9% of the United Kingdom's full-time and part-time professors in science. The award consists of a medal and a grant of £30,000. The recipient delivers a lecture as part of the Society's public lecture series, some of which are available on YouTube.

== Laureates ==
- 2003: Susan Gibson on Make me a molecule. Awarded presented by Patricia Hewitt, serving Minister for Women and Equalities.
- 2004: Carol V. Robinson on Finding the right balance.
- 2005: Christine Davies on The quandary of the quark.
- 2006: Andrea Brand on Constructing a nervous system: stem cells to synapses
- 2007: Ottoline Leyser on Thinking like a vegetable: how plants decide what to do
- 2008: Eleanor Maguire on Mapping memory: the brains behind remembering
- 2009: Sunetra Gupta on Surviving pandemics: a pathogen's perspective
- 2010: Katherine Blundell on Black holes and spin offs
- 2011: Francesca Happé on When will we understand Autism Spectrum Disorders?
- 2012: Polly Arnold on Extracting value from waste through a little chemistry with U
- 2013: Sarah-Jayne Blakemore for her scientific achievements
- 2014: Rachel McKendry for her scientific achievement.
- 2015: Lucy Carpenter for her scientific achievement and her suitability as a role model
- 2016: Jo Dunkley for her research in the cosmic microwave background and her innovative project to support and encourage girls studying physics.
- 2017: Essi Viding for her achievements in the field of experimental psychology
- 2018: Tamsin Mather for her work in the field of volcanology
- 2019: Nguyen TK Thanh for her work in nanotechnology
- 2020: Julia Gog for her achievements in the field of mathematics and her impactful project proposal with its potential for a long-term legacy.
- 2021: Suzanne Imber for her achievements in the field of planetary science and her well-considered project proposal with a potential for a high impact
- 2022: Diane Saunders for "her innovative mentoring and training project to support and empower undergraduates and early-career female researchers in plant sciences at postgraduate and postdoctoral levels".
- 2023: Karen Johnson for her achievements in environmental engineering and her impactful project explaining the importance and of soil health and how and why it should be conserved
- 2024: Jess Wade for "her achievements in functional materials and outstanding project which will support early career women scientists to pursue academic careers in materials sciences".
- 2025: Clare Burrage "for her achievements in theoretical cosmology and her proposed project which aims to inspire and engage girls of all ages with physics"

== Rosalind Franklin Award Committee ==
As of 2018 the Rosalind Franklin award committee (which takes the decision on the prize each year) includes:

- Frances Ashcroft
- Edward Hinds
- Lucy Carpenter
- Thomas James Simpson
- Frances Kirwan
- Eric Priest
- Jason Arday (2024–2025)
