= Geraint Rees =

British scientist

Geraint Rees FMedSci FRCP
- Born: Geraint Ellis Rees; 27 November 1967 (age 58); Cambridge, UK
- Education: University of Cambridge (BA); University of Oxford (BM, BCh); University College London (PhD)
- Awards: Crick Lecture 2007
- Scientific career
- Fields: Cognitive neuroscience Functional MRI; Consciousness
- Workplaces: University College London; Francis Crick Institute; DeepMind; California Institute of Technology
- Thesis: An investigation of the neural correlates of selective attention in humans using functional imaging (1999)
- Doctoral advisor: Chris Frith
- Website: www.ucl.ac.uk/icn/people/geraint-rees

Geraint Ellis Rees is a British scientist who is Vice-Provost of research, innovation & global engagement at University College London (UCL). Previously he served as Dean of the UCL Faculty of Life Sciences, UCL Pro-Provost (Academic Planning), Pro-Vice-Provost (AI) and a Professor of Cognitive Neurology at University College London. He is also a Director of UCL Business, a trustee of the Alan Turing Institute, a trustee of the Francis Crick Institute and a trustee of the Guarantors of Brain.

Until 2021 he was a founding Trustee of the charity in2scienceUK; until 2016 he was a member of the Francis Crick Institute Executive Team; from 2012 - 2014 he was Deputy Head of the UCL Faculty of Brain Sciences, and from 2009 to 2014 the Director of the UCL Institute of Cognitive Neuroscience. He held a Wellcome Trust Senior Clinical Fellowship from 2003 to 2018.

== Education ==
Geraint Rees was born in 1967 in Cambridge and educated at Queen Elizabeth Grammar School, Wakefield and Bradford Grammar School. Rees received his Bachelor of Arts degree in the Medical Science Tripos in 1988 from the University of Cambridge where he was an undergraduate student of Gonville and Caius College, Cambridge. He moved to the University of Oxford where he received his Bachelor of Medicine, Bachelor of Surgery (BM BCh) degree in 1991 where he was a student of New College, Oxford. He completed his PhD under the supervision of Chris Frith at University College London's Functional Imaging Laboratory in 1999.

== Career and research ==
After his PhD, Rees then worked as a postdoctoral fellow in Christof Kochs laboratory at the California Institute of Technology for two years before returning to the Institute of Cognitive Neuroscience at University College London in 2001. In 2002 he became a group leader with the award of a Senior Fellowship from the Wellcome Trust. His Senior Fellowship was renewed in 2007 and 2012. His work has been internationally recognised with the award in 2003 of the Young Investigator Medal of The Organization for Human Brain Mapping. In 2007 he was awarded the Experimental Psychology Society Prize and gave the Royal Society Francis Crick Lecture. In February 2009 he gave the Goulstonian lecture of the Royal College of Physicians.

As of July 2026, his work has been cited 33,225 (ISI) or 61,701 Google Scholar times; his ISI H-index is 93, his h-index is 122 and his I10-index is 333.

He served as Secretary and Treasurer of the Guarantors of Brain, and an Associate Editor of the journal Brain between 2007-2014 and remains a trustee of the charity. In 2008 he was elected a Fellow of the Royal College of Physicians of London. In 2010 he was elected a Fellow of the Academy of Medical Sciences. He was a member of the Medical Research Council Neuroscience and Mental Health Board 2008-2012 and a member of the Medical Programme (subsequently Professional) Board for England from its inception until 2012. His Who's Who entry lists his recreation as 'achieving a better work/life balance'

Rees research interests are on the neural mechanisms underlying human consciousness in health and disease. At present most work focuses on the neural correlates of particular types of conscious content, aiming to distinguish between conscious and unconscious representations in the human brain. As a considerable amount is already known about the anatomy and physiology of the visual system, much of the research in the laboratory focuses on visual awareness. However, his laboratory also studies the auditory and somatosensory systems. Most research involves functional MRI at high field, in combination with behavioral studies, transcranial magnetic stimulation and EEG/MEG. Previous work by Rees has suggested that subjective awareness of objects in the visual environment is associated not just with enhanced activation in visual areas of the occipital lobe, but also areas of parietal and prefrontal cortex often associated with attention. A major focus of this work is therefore in studying interactions between visual cortex and these areas, both in the context of attention, and with respect to eye movements.

More recently, he has worked on neurodegeneration, collaborating with Sarah Tabrizi. His work on multivariate inference has led to collaborations with Parashkev Nachev and work in high-dimensional neurology and with DeepMind.

He co-edited a large reference book entitled the Neurobiology of Attention with Laurent Itti and John Tsotsos, and is the author of numerous articles and invited reviews on the functional imaging of consciousness.

He was a member of the board of the Association for the Scientific Study of Consciousness until stepping down in 2007, and with Patrick Wilken organised its tenth annual meeting that was held at St. Anne's College, Oxford in June 2006.

In 2011, Rees co-authored a neuroscience paper, Political Orientations Are Correlated with Brain Structure in Young Adults together with among others actor Colin Firth, who had suggested on BBC Radio 4 that such a paper could be written.

=== Teaching and training ===
Rees is currently Director of the UCL SLMS Academic Careers Office which delivers strategy and support to academics and clinical academics at UCL. He directs a Wellcome Trust Clinical PhD Programme and a large MRC Doctoral Training Programme associated with the ACO. Previously Rees was the elected Deputy Chair of the British Medical Association (BMA) Medical Academic Staff Committee (MASC) 2007-12, and led on policy development concerning medical academic training. He was a member of the Medical Programme Board for England 2007-2012 and chaired the MPB Recruitment Task and Finish Group overseeing recruitment of all trainee doctors in England. He served on the 'Walport' committee of the UK Clinical Research Collaboration developing Academic Clinical Fellow and Clinical Lecturer schemes, and leads the local ACF and CL schemes at University College London. He was also course director for over a decade for the Membership of the Royal College of Physicians (MRCP) Part 1 courses in London run by Pastest.

=== Enterprise and innovation ===
Rees is a Non-Executive Director of UCL Business PLC, the technology transfer company associated with UCL. He was also a Senior Scientific Advisor at Google DeepMind between 2015-2020. Rees was Chair of the Knowledge Transfer and Enterprise Board, of the UCL School of Life and Medical Sciences between 2014-2017. He was a Director of Imanova Limited, a molecular imaging company until August 2017 when it was acquired by Invicro.
