= Chris Frith =

British neuroscientist (born 1942)

Chris Frith FRS FMedSci FBA
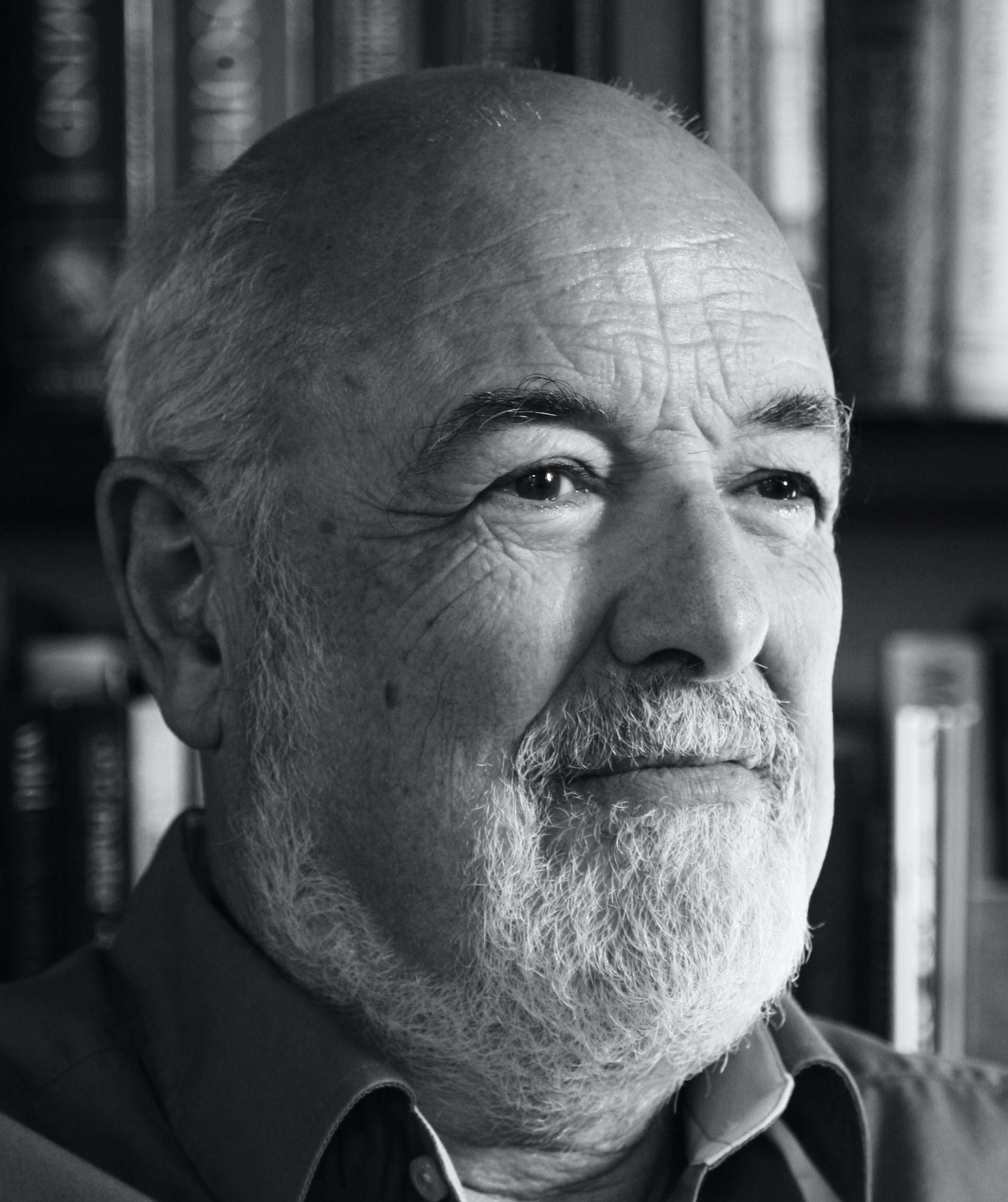
- Chris Frith in 2012
- Born: Christopher Donald Frith; 16 March 1942 (age 84); Cross in Hand, Sussex, England
- Education: The Leys School; University of Cambridge; University of London
- Spouse: Uta Frith
- Children: 2
- Awards: Fyssen Foundation Prize; Jean Nicod Prize; European Latsis Prize
- Scientific career
- Workplaces: Wellcome Trust Centre for Neuroimaging; University College London
- Thesis: Individual differences in pursuit rotor and tapping skills (1969)
- Doctoral advisor: Hans Eysenck
- Doctoral students: Geraint Rees; Sarah-Jayne Blakemore
- Website: sites.google.com/site/chrisdfrith/Home

Christopher Donald Frith (born 16 March 1942) is a British psychologist and professor emeritus at the Wellcome Centre for Neuroimaging at University College London. He is also an affiliated research worker at the Interacting Minds Centre at Aarhus University, an honorary Research Fellow at the Institute of Philosophy and a Quondam Fellow of All Souls College, Oxford.

== Education ==
Chris Frith was born in 1942 in Cross in Hand, Sussex and educated at The Leys School in Cambridge, before reading Natural Sciences at Christ's College, Cambridge, graduating in 1963. He then completed a Diploma in Abnormal Psychology and a PhD at the Institute of Psychiatry, London, under the supervision of Hans Eysenck.

== Research ==
Frith has published more than 500 papers in peer reviewed journals, of which about 150 papers have more than 400 citations. He has an h-index of 225.

In 1975 Frith joined an MRC research group at Northwick Park Hospital, dedicated to exploring the biological basis of schizophrenia. There he developed his cognitive account of the symptoms of schizophrenia, in particular delusions of alien control, the false belief that one's actions are being controlled by external forces. Using a predictive coding framework, Frith suggested that, whenever we move, the brain generates predictions about sensory input and that the similarity of these predictions with actual sensory input underpins our sense of agency. Disruption of this process in schizophrenia may lead individuals to attribute their own actions to external sources. This idea continues to be explored by Frith and others and has generated interest among philosophers and artists.

In the 1990s, at the MRC Cyclotron Unit, Hammersmith Hospital, Frith was among the first to apply functional neuroimaging (PET and fMRI) to the study of cognitive processes. In 1994 he became a founder member of the Wellcome Centre for Human Neuroimaging at the Institute of Neurology in Queen Square. Here he explored the neural basis of cognitive abilities including voluntary action, consciousness, and Theory of Mind.

In collaboration with Uta Frith, Chris Frith has promoted the study of social cognition which has become a mainstream interest in neuropsychology. In 2007 he started a collaboration on interacting minds with Andreas Roepstorff and colleagues at Aarhus University, Denmark. Frith and these colleagues demonstrated, experimentally, some of the mechanisms of advantageous group decision making and the emergence of mutual behavioural adaptation in simple joint action. This former work provided the basis for an animation on group decision-making commissioned by the Royal Society. The interacting minds perspective adopted by Frith and colleagues emphasizes the idea that cognition and social interaction are fundamentally intertwined and that the human mind is shaped, not only by a person’s cognitive abilities, but also by their interactions with other minds.

His former doctoral students include Geraint Rees and Sarah-Jayne Blakemore.

He is the author of The Cognitive Neuropsychology of Schizophrenia (1992), revised and re-issued (2015), which won a British Psychological Society Book Award in 1996. He also wrote the popular science book Making up the Mind: How the Brain Creates Our Mental World (2007) which won a British Psychological Society (BPS) Book Award in 2008 and was also on the long list for the Royal Society Prizes for Science Books that year. He co-authored the graphic novel Two Heads: Where Two Neuroscientists Explore How Our Brains Work with Other Brains in 2022. The book What Makes Us Social?, co-authored with Uta Frith, was also given a BPS Book Award, in 2024.

=== Fellowships and awards ===
Frith was elected a Fellow of The Academy of Medical Sciences (FMedSci), a Fellow of The Royal Society (FRS), a Fellow of The American Association for the Advancement of Science (FAAAS) (all in 2000) and a Fellow of The British Academy (FBA) in 2008. He was the President of The Association for the Scientific Study of Consciousness in 2001.

In September 2008, a two day festschrift was held in honour of Frith at the Royal Society. The topic was 'Mind in the Brain'. Hosts included Ray Dolan, Paul Burgess, Jon Driver and Geraint Rees. In 2009 he was awarded the Fyssen Foundation Prize for his work on neuropsychology and he and Uta Frith were awarded the European Latsis Prize for their work linking the human mind and the human brain. In 2014, he and Uta Frith were awarded the Jean Nicod Prize for their work on social cognition. In 2021 he gave the 49th Sir Frederic Bartlett Lecture on the topic "Consciousness, (meta)Cognition, Culture".

== Personal life ==
Frith is the brother of guitarist Fred Frith and musicologist Simon Frith. In 1966 he married Uta Frith, a developmental psychologist. In 2008 they were the subject of a double portrait by Emma Wesley. They have two sons, one a computational biologist and one an author.

== Bibliography ==
- Frith, C.D. (1992) The Cognitive Neuropsychology of Schizophrenia. Lawrence Erlbaum Associates, Hove. Classic Edition, Routledge (2015) Translations: Spanish, Japanese, French, Italian)
- Frith, C.D. & Johnstone, E.C. (2003) Schizophrenia: A Very Short Introduction. Oxford University Press. (Translations: Chinese, Polish, Russian, etc.)
- Frith, C.D. & Wolpert, D.M. (Eds.) (2004) The Neuroscience of Social Interaction: Decoding, imitating and influencing the actions of others. Oxford University Press.
- Frith, C.D. (2007) Making up the mind: how the brain creates our mental world. Oxford, Wiley-Blackwell. (Translations: Spanish, French, Korean, Italian, Japanese, Hebrew, German, Polish, Russian, Chinese, Flemish)
- Fleming, S.M., Frith, C.D. (Eds.) (2014) The cognitive neuroscience of metacognition. Springer, Heidelberg.
- Frith, U., Frith, C.D., Frith, A., and Locke, D. (2022) Two Heads: Where Two Neuroscientists Explore How Our Brains Work with Other Brains. (London: Bloomsbury). (Translation: Korean)
- Frith, C.D. and Frith, U. (2023) What Makes Us Social? (Cambridge, Mass: MIT Press).
