= Anna Christina Nobre =

Brazilian neuroscientist (born 1963)

Kia Nobre
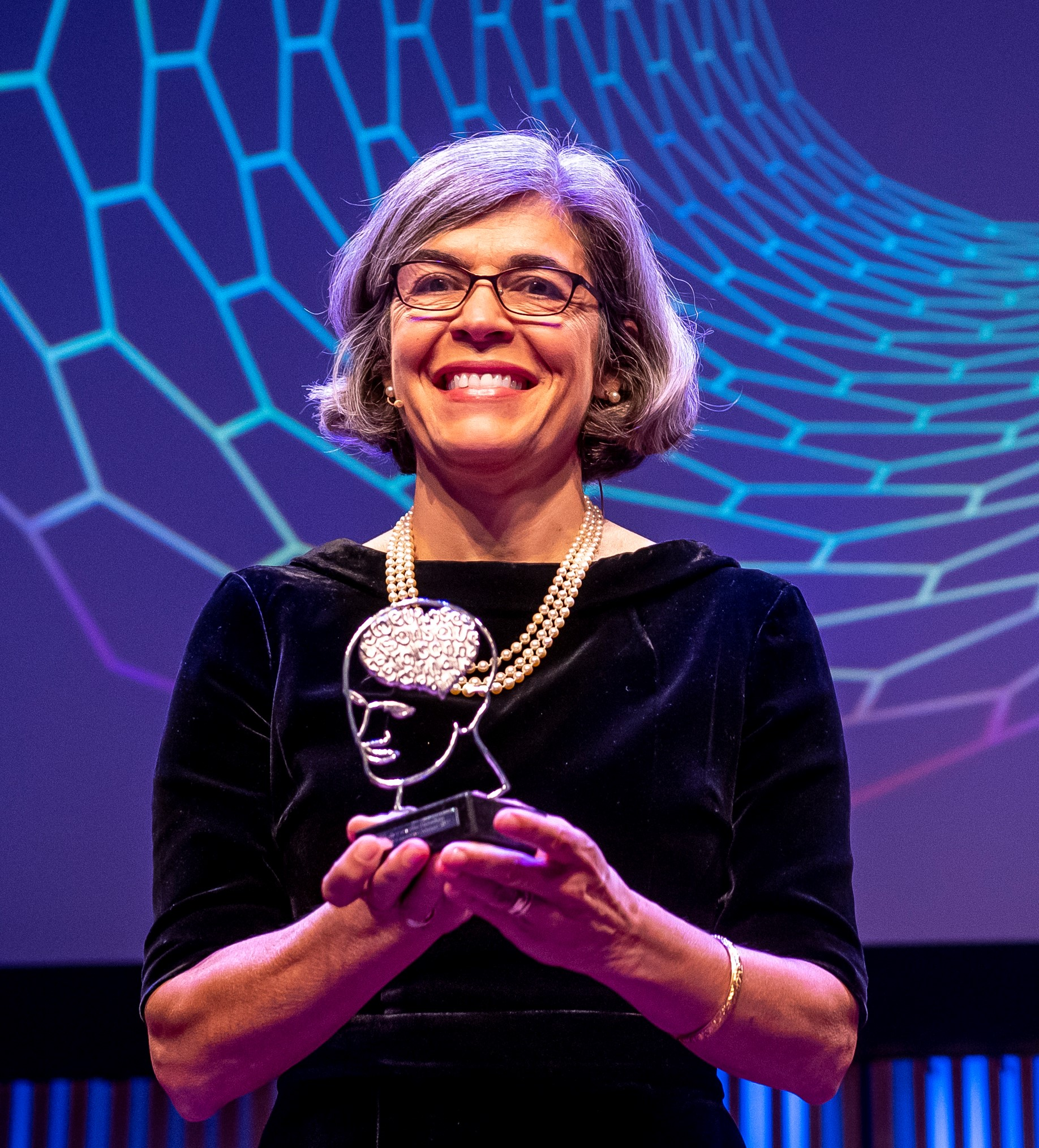
- Nobre in 2022
- Born: Anna Christina Nobre; 22 February 1963 (age 63); Rio de Janeiro, Brazil
- Education: Williams College; Yale University
- Scientific career
- Fields: Neuroscience
- Institutions: Yale University; Harvard University; University of Oxford
- Doctoral advisor: Gregory McCarthy

Anna Christina Nobre FBA, MAE, fNASc (known as Kia Nobre; born 1963) is a Brazilian and British cognitive neuroscientist. She is the Wu Tsai Professor at Yale University. She is an honorary member of the Departments of Psychiatry and Experimental Psychology at the University of Oxford; an honorary fellow of New College, Oxford; and an adjunct professor at the Mesulam Center for Cognitive Neurology and Alzheimer's Disease at Northwestern University Feinberg School of Medicine.

Nobre's research contributions are widely recognized. She is a Fellow of the British Academy (elected 2015), a Member of the Academia Europaea (elected 2015), an international fellow of the National Academy of Sciences (elected 2020), and an international honorary member of the American Academy of Arts and Sciences (elected 2024). She received the MRC Suffrage Science Award (2016), the Broadbent Prize from the European Society for Cognitive Psychology (2019), the Lifetime Mentor Award from the Association for Psychological Science (APS), the C.L. de Carvalho-Heineken Prize for Cognitive Science, and the Fred Kavli Distinguished Career Contributions Award from the Cognitive Neuroscience Society. Other markers of acclaim include elected membership to the International Neuropsychological Symposium and Memory Disorders Research Society, and fellowship of the American Psychological Society.

== Research ==
Nobre leads the Brain & Cognition Lab. Current research in the group investigates how the brain prioritizes and selects useful information from the sensory stream and from memories at various time scales to generate experience and behavior. In addition to revealing the basic mechanisms of these large-scale proactive and dynamic regulatory mechanisms, they examine how the mechanisms develop over the lifespan and how they are disrupted in psychiatric and neurodegenerative disorders. The research combines various behavioral methods (psychophysics, eye tracking, virtual reality) with innovative and complementary non-invasive techniques to image and stimulate the human brain (magneto- and electroencephalography, functional magnetic resonance imaging, and brain stimulation).

Research milestones by Nobre and her group include: discovering brain areas specialized for word recognition (1994) and face processing (1994) in the human brain using intracranial recordings; describing the functional neuroanatomy of the network for controlling spatial attention in the human brain and noting its relation to oculomotor control (1997); pioneering the neuroscientific study of temporal expectations (temporal orienting) (1998), demonstrating the ability to orient selective attention within working memory (2003), developing new experimental approaches to investigate how long-term memories guide selective attention (2006), and introducing new somatic markers of attention in memory (2019).

== Leadership and service ==
Worldwide, Nobre contributes to various advisory bodies to scientific institutions and holds roles on multiple editorial, funding, conference, and jury boards. During her years at Oxford, she served as a Delegate for the Oxford University Press (2005-15), Director of the Oxford Centre for Human Brain Activity (OHBA) (2010-23), Head of the Department of Experimental Psychology (2016-21), Head of the Interdepartmental Neuroscience Committee (2016-21), and Non-Executive Director of the Oxford Health Foundation Trust (2021-23).

== Life and work ==
Nobre grew up in Rio de Janeiro, Brazil, and was educated at the Escola Americana do Rio de Janeiro (EARJ). As a young child, she spent two years in New York City, while her father completed a postgraduate degree at NYU (1967–68). She moved to the United States to complete her higher education. She obtained her BA from Williams College in 1985, with a Contract Major in Neuroscience; and obtained her PhD (1993) from Yale University for research on intracranial and non-invasive electrophysiological studies of language and attention in the human brain, supervised by Gregory McCarthy. During her doctoral and then postdoctoral period at Yale, she was part of the first studies to use non-invasive fMRI to investigate cognitive functions in the human brain. In 1993, she joined Marsel Mesulam's group at the Behavioural Neurology Unit at Beth Israel Hospital, Harvard Medical School as Instructor.

She moved to Oxford in 1994 to take up a McDonnell Pew Lecturership in Cognitive Neuroscience and the combined Astor and Todd-Bird Junior Research Fellowship at New College (1994-1996). This was the first JRF in the discipline of psychology at Oxford. Between 1996 and 2014 she was a Tutorial Fellow at New College and rose through the ranks from Lecturer to Titular Professor in the Department of Experimental Psychology. At New College, she was the first female Tutorial Fellow in a science discipline. In recognition of her contributions and standing, she was made an Honorary Fellow of New College (2016). In 2014, she became the first Chair in Translational Cognitive Neuroscience, a post held jointly between the Departments of Psychiatry and Experimental Psychology. Nobre moved to Yale University in 2023. As director of the Centre of Neurocognition and Behavior at the Wu Tsai Institute, Nobre oversees BrainWorks, a collaborative core facility with advanced methods for investigating the human brain, and is planning a new knowledge-sharing program to connect the science of the human brain/mind to other academic disciplines, non-academic sectors, and the public.
