= Eve Johnstone =

British neuroscientist

Eve Johnstone CBE FRCP FRCPE FRCPGla FRCPsych FMedSci FRSE
- Born: Eve Cordelia Johnstone; 1 September 1944 (age 82); Glasgow, Scotland
- Education: University of Glasgow
- Occupations: Physician, clinical researcher, psychiatrist, academic
- Medical career
- Field: Neuroscience
- Sub-specialties: Schizophrenia
- Notable works: Cerebral ventricular size and cognitive impairment in chronic schizophrenia

Eve Cordelia Johnstone (born 1 September 1944) is a Scottish physician, clinical researcher, psychiatrist and academic. Her main research area is in the field of schizophrenia and psychotic illness. She is emeritus Professor of Psychiatry and Honorary Assistant Principal for Mental Health Research Development and Public Understanding of Medicine at the University of Edinburgh. She is best known for her 1976 groundbreaking study that showed brain abnormalities in schizophrenic patients compared to a control group.

== Early life and education ==
Eve Cordelia Johnstone was born on 1 September 1944 in Glasgow. Her parents were Dorothy Mary and William Gillespie Johnstone, a dental surgeon. She attended Park School in Glasgow before going on to study medicine at the University of Glasgow, graduating with her MB ChB in 1967. From 1968 to 1972, she continued her training in hospitals in Glasgow specialising in psychiatry.

== Career and research ==
Having completed her training she lectured in psychological medicine at the University of Glasgow. In 1974 she took a position at the Medical Research Council research clinic in Harrow, London. While at the MRC Johnstone lead a group of researchers in the study of the brains of schizophrenic patients. She used a CT scanner to generate brain images, and demonstrated that there were anatomical differences between the brains of people with schizophrenia and a normal control group. She was also a pioneer in researching individuals at high risk of developing schizophrenia and potential preventative treatment.

In addition to her research interests, Johnstone is a full-time consultant psychiatrist at the Royal Edinburgh Hospital. She is also Professor of Psychiatry at the University of Edinburgh and an Assistant Principal at the University of Edinburgh.

From 1991 to 1994, she was a member of the Nuffield Council on Bioethics.

Johnstone's personal interests include card-playing, gardening, listening to opera, and travel.

== Awards and honours ==
In recognition for her research and work she has received several honours and awards:

- Fellow of the Royal College of Psychiatrists, 1984
- Fellow of the Royal College of Physicians of Edinburgh, 1992
- Fellow of the Academy of Medical Sciences, 1998
- Commander of the Order of the British Empire (CBE), 2002
- Fellow of the Royal Society of Edinburgh, 2005
- Lieber Prize for Outstanding Achievement in Schizophrenia Research from NARSAD, 2007
- Honorary Doctor of Medicine, University of Edinburgh, 2014
- Fellow of the Royal College of Physicians and Surgeons of Glasgow
- Fellow of the Royal College of Physicians

== Selected works ==
- Schizophrenia: A Very Short Introduction (Very Short Introductions series) by Christopher Frith and Eve Johnstone
- Searching for the Causes of Schizophrenia (Oxford Medical Publications) by Eve C. Johnstone, 1994
- Biological Psychiatry by Eve C. Johnstone, 1996
- Schizophrenia: Concepts and Clinical Management by Eve C. Johnstone, Martin S. Humphreys, Fiona H. Lang, and Stephen M. Lawrie, 1999
- Companion to Psychiatric Studies by Eve Johnstone, C. Freeman, and A. Zealley, 1999
- Schizophrenia: From Neuroimaging to Neuroscience by Daniel R. Weinberger, Eve C. Johnstone, 2005
