= Robert Malenka =

American academic

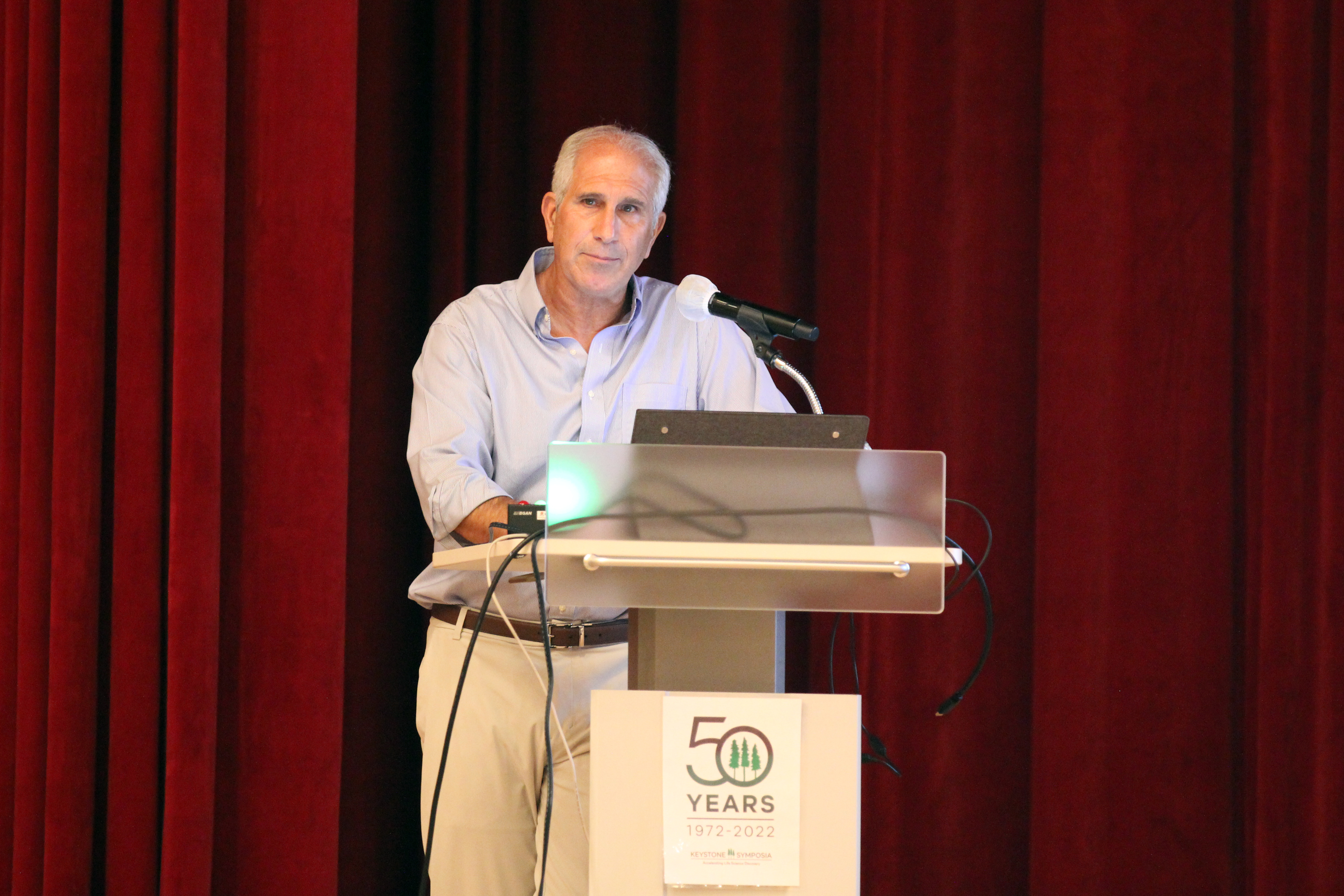
- Education: Harvard University, Stanford University
- Awards: Perl-UNC Prize (2005)
- Scientific career
- Fields: Psychiatry and behavioral sciences
- Workplaces: Stanford University, Stanford Medical Center

Robert C. Malenka (born June 21, 1955) is a Nancy Friend Pritzker Professor in Psychiatry and Behavioral Sciences at Stanford University. He is also the director of the Nancy Friend Pritzker Laboratory in the Stanford Medical Center. He is a member of the National Academies of Sciences, Engineering, and Medicine, as well as the American Academy of Arts and Sciences. Malenka's laboratory research with the National Alzheimer's Foundation has informed researchers aiming to find a neuronal basis for Alzheimer's disease. Malenka's main career is focused on studying the mechanisms of synaptic plasticity and the effects of neural circuits on learning and memory.

== Early years and education ==
Robert Malenka grew up playing sports in the town of Belmont, Massachusetts. Malenka is still an avid tennis player and athletic spectator. He grew up with his brother, David Malenka, who is currently practicing cardiology at the Dartmouth Hitchcock Medical Center in Hanover, New Hampshire. Malenka always had an interest in science, and while choosing a career path also considered being a neurosurgeon, neurologist, and clinical psychologist.

For Malenka's undergraduate education, he attended Harvard University and graduated in 1978. After his graduation, Malenka received his MD and PhD from Stanford University in 1983. While receiving these titles, he also completed his psychiatric residency at Stanford and a postdoctoral fellowship at the University of California, San Francisco.

== Career ==
Malenka has spent the last ten years in his lab identifying the mechanically distinct forms of synaptic plasticity present in the human brain. His main goal was to distinctly separate the steps which lead to the varying forms of synaptic plasticity, while also identifying the proteins which contribute to the altering of synaptic efficacy over time. As a side project in his laboratory, Malenka studies the effects that drugs like cocaine and amphetamine have on synaptic plasticity. In recent years, he has isolated a novel form of synaptic plasticity in the nucleus accumbens, the part of the brain associated with reward pathways.

== Professional organizations ==
Spanning from 1999 to 2008, Malenka served on the Society for Neuroscience's Programming Committee, the Renovis Incorporated Advisory Board, and the Merck Incorporated Advisory Board.

He is currently on the Scientific Council for the Brain and Behavior Research Foundation, and is on the board of directors for the Brain Research Foundation.

Malenka is also the co-founder of Circuit Therapeutics, Inc, a company which he began working with in 2012. Circuit Therapeutics uses optogenetic technology to target specific neurons in patients who suffer from chronic diseases and have damaged neuronal function.

== Publications ==
Malenka's work has been published in 274 papers. One of his first major publications was in Neuron Magazine's inaugural issue, a paper in which he proposed that long-term potentiation at neuronal synapses must involve some postsynaptic modifications.

== Awards and honors ==
Robert Malenka's first major career award was the Young Investigator Award, given to him by the Society for Neuroscience in 1993.

After graduation from Stanford Medical School, Malenka earned the Distinguished Alumni Award in 1998. In that same year, Malenka earned the Daniel Efron Award, given to him by the American College of Neuropsychopharmacology.

Malenka's first international award came in 2000, when he received the International Prize in Neuroscience from the Milena Kemali Foundation.

Malenka is a two-time recipient of the Julius Axelrod Prize, one given as a mentorship award from the American College of Neuropsychopharmacology (2011), and the other given to him by the Society for Neuroscience in 2016.

== Talks and interviews ==
Huberman Lab Podcast, July 2023

CSHL Leading Strand, June 2018

World Economic Forum, February 2016

USRP, July 2015
