= Eleanor Maguire =

Irish neuroscientist (1970–2025)

Eleanor Maguire FRS FMedSci FBA MRIA
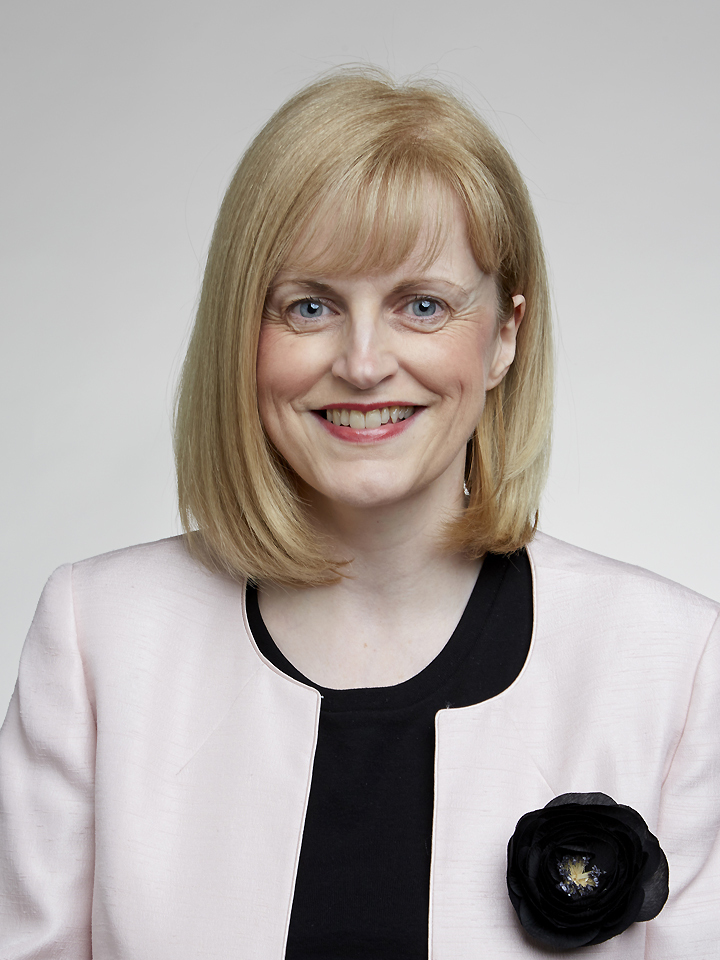
- Maguire in 2016
- Born: 27 March 1970; Dublin, Ireland
- Died: 4 January 2025 (aged 54); London, England
- Education: University College Dublin (BA, PhD); University of Wales, Swansea (MSc)
- Years active: 2007–2025
- Awards: Ig Nobel Prize (2003); Rosalind Franklin Award (2008); IBRO-Kemali Prize (2012); Joan Mott Prize Lecture (2013)
- Scientific career
- Fields: Neuroscience; Neuropsychology; Biomedical imaging
- Workplaces: University College London; Wellcome Trust Centre for Neuroimaging
- Thesis: Real-world spatial memory following temporal-lobe surgery in humans (1994)
- Doctoral students: Demis Hassabis

Eleanor Anne Maguire (27 March 1970 – 4 January 2025) was an Irish neuroscientist who was Professor of Cognitive Neuroscience at University College London, where she was also a Wellcome Trust principal research fellow, from 2007 until her death in 2025.

== Early life and education ==
Maguire was born in Dublin, Ireland on 27 March 1970. She studied psychology at University College Dublin and graduated with a Bachelor of Arts (BA Hons) degree in 1990. She studied clinical and experimental neuropsychology at University of Wales, Swansea and graduated with a Master of Science degree in 1991. She undertook her Doctor of Philosophy (PhD) degree at University College Dublin, Ireland, where she first became interested in the neural basis of memory while working with patients as a neuropsychologist at Beaumont Hospital, Dublin. She completed her PhD in 1994, and her doctoral thesis was titled Real-world spatial memory following temporal-lobe surgery in humans.

== Research and career ==
Maguire served as a Wellcome Trust Principal Research Fellow and Professor of Cognitive Neuroscience at the Wellcome Trust Centre for Neuroimaging at University College London, UK, where she was also the deputy director. Maguire led the Memory and Space research laboratory at the centre. In addition, she was an honorary member of the Department of Neuropsychology, National Hospital for Neurology and Neurosurgery, Queen Square, London.

Maguire and others have noted that a distributed set of brain regions supports human episodic (autobiographical) memory, defined as the memory for personal everyday events, and that this brain network overlaps considerably with that supporting navigation in large-scale space and other diverse cognitive functions such as imagination and thinking about the future. In her research Maguire sought to place episodic memory in the context of wider cognition so as to understand how common brain areas, and possibly common processes, support such disparate functions. In this way she hoped to gain novel and fundamental insights into the mechanisms that are involved.

Her team used standard whole brain and high resolution structural and functional magnetic resonance imaging in conjunction with behavioural testing and neuropsychological examination of amnesic patients to pursue their aims. They mainly employed ecologically valid or 'real life' experimental paradigms to examine brain-behaviour relationships; examples include using virtual reality to examine navigation, investigating autobiographical memories of people's personal past experiences, and their ability to imagine fictitious and future scenes and events. Perhaps the most famous of these is her series of studies on London taxi drivers, where she documented changes in hippocampal structure associated with acquiring the knowledge of London's layout. A redistribution of grey matter was indicated in London Taxi Drivers compared to controls. This work on hippocampal plasticity not only interested scientists, but also engaged the public and media world-wide.

This is also true of her other work such as that showing that patients with amnesia cannot imagine the future which several years ago was rated as one of the scientific breakthroughs of the year; and her other studies demonstrating that it is possible to decode people's memories from the pattern of fMRI activity in the hippocampus.

Maguire's interest was mainly focused on the hippocampus, a brain structure known to be crucial for learning and memory, whilst also exploring the roles of the parahippocampal cortex, the retrosplenial cortex and the ventromedial prefrontal cortex. She supervised numerous doctoral students including Demis Hassabis.

=== Public engagement ===
Besides her direct scientific activities, Maguire and her research group had an active public engagement agenda, involving public lectures, school visits and demonstrations, TV, radio and internet contributions, and collaborations with several artists, encouraging people of all ages to think about the value of science in their everyday lives. In February 2014, Maguire delivered a Friday Evening Discourse at The Royal Institution.

== Personal life and death ==
Maguire's entry in Who's Who listed her recreations as "Comedy lover, long-suffering supporter of Crystal Palace Football Club, [and] getting lost."

Maguire was diagnosed with spinal cancer in 2022. She died from complications of cancer and pneumonia at a hospice in London on 4 January 2025, at the age of 54.

=== Honours and awards ===
Maguire won a number of prizes for outstanding contributions to science, including:

- 2003, the Ig Nobel Prize for Medicine, awarded for 'presenting evidence that the brains of London taxi drivers are more highly developed than those of their fellow citizens'
- 2008 the Rosalind Franklin Award from the Royal Society
- 2011 Feldberg Foundation Prize
- 2012 Cognitive Neuroscience Society Young Investigator Award
- 2012 IBRO-Kemali Prize
- 2016 University College Dublin Alumnus of the Year in Research, Innovation and Impact

She was also named as one of 'Twenty Europeans who have changed our lives' when The European Union launched a new science and innovation initiative. In 2011, Maguire was elected a Fellow of the Academy of Medical Sciences (FMedSci) and, in 2016, a Fellow of the Royal Society (FRS).

In 2017 she was elected an Honorary Member of the Royal Irish Academy (MRIA) and in July 2018 was elected Fellow of the British Academy (FBA).

== See also ==
- List of Ig Nobel Prize winners
