= Paul Younger (engineer) =

British hydrogeologist

Paul Younger (1 November 1962 – 21 April 2018) was a British hydrogeologist, environmental engineer and writer. He worked both on water resources (development and regulation), and water pollution (prevention, remediation and treatment).

== Biography ==
Younger respectively obtained in 1984 a B.Sc. degree with first class honours in Geology from Newcastle University, in 1986 an M.Sc. degree in Hydrogeology from Oklahoma State University, and in 1990 a Ph.D. degree with as subject "Numerical Modelling of Water Resource Systems" from the Newcastle University. His PhD thesis at Newcastle University involved the use of numerical modelling techniques to assess pollution risks in coupled river / groundwater systems in the London Basin. He subsequently ran water resources research and training projects in the West Bank, and immersed himself in the water management issues of the mining sector worldwide.

From 2001 Younger was a full Professor at Newcastle University in the UK. He subsequently served the University as Public Orator (2004–2010) and as Pro-Vice-Chancellor for Engagement (2008–2010). He was Director of the Newcastle Institute for Research on Sustainability, which has water as one of its ten core themes. He occupied the Rankine Chair of Engineering at Glasgow University, where he redeployed his skills and experience in the service of low-carbon energy, notably deep geothermal energy, underground coal gasification with carbon capture and storage, and hydropower. Younger was a Director of four companies engaged in the water and energy sectors, including Non-Executive Technical Director of CluffGeothermal, and was Chair of the Global Scientific Committee of the Planet Earth Institute. He published more than 250 papers in the international peer-reviewed literature.

It was announced on 24 April 2018 that he had died at the age of 55.

== Honours ==
- 1989–2018: Fellow of the Geological Society (FGS)
- 1995 – 2007: Fellow of the Chartered Institution of Water and Environmental Management (FCIWEM)
- 2000–2018: Fellow of the North of England Institute of Mining and Mechanical Engineers (FIME)
- 2001 – 2007: Fellow of the Institution of Mining and Metallurgy (FIMM)
- 2005: Queen's Anniversary Prize, for Higher Education
- 2007–2018: Fellow of the Royal Academy of Engineering (FREng) – this being the top professional honour for engineers in the UK.
- 2009–2018: Deputy Lieutenant (DL) for the County of Tyne and Wear.
- 2010–2018: Fellow of the Institution of Chemical Engineers (FICE)
- 2010: Awarded honorary doctorates in both Spain (Escuela de Minas, Universidad de Oviedo) and Perú (Universidad Nacional de San Agustín, Arequipa) for his contributions to the environmental management of mine waters worldwide.
- 2016–2018: Fellow of the Royal Society of Edinburgh (FRSE)

== Selected bibliography ==
- Mine Water – Hydrology, Pollution, Remediation (Chapman-Hall, 2002)
- Groundwater in the Environment – an Introduction (Blackwell, 2007)
- All that Matters: Water (Hodder Education, 2012) ISBN 9781444156812
