= Imaging genetics =

Use of imaging to evaluate genetic variation

Imaging genetics refers to the use of anatomical or physiological imaging technologies as phenotypic assays to evaluate genetic variation. Scientists that first used the term imaging genetics were interested in how genes influence psychopathology and used functional neuroimaging to investigate genes that are expressed in the brain (neuroimaging genetics).

Imaging genetics uses research approaches in which genetic information and fMRI data in the same subjects are combined to define neuro-mechanisms linked to genetic variation. With the images and genetic information, it can be determined how individual differences in single nucleotide polymorphisms, or SNPs, lead to differences in brain wiring structure, and intellectual function. Imaging genetics allows the direct observation of the link between genes and brain activity in which the overall idea is that common variants in SNPs lead to common diseases. A neuroimaging phenotype is attractive because it is closer to the biology of genetic function than illnesses or cognitive phenotypes.

== Alzheimer's disease ==
By combining the outputs of the polygenic and neuro-imaging within a linear model, it has been shown that genetic information provides additive value in the task of predicting Alzheimer's disease (AD). AD traditionally has been considered a disease marked by neuronal cell loss and widespread gray matter atrophy and the apolipoprotein E allele (APOE4) is a widely confirmed genetic risk factor for late-onset AD.

Another gene risk variant is associated with Alzheimer's, which is known as the CLU gene risk variant. The CLU gene risk variant showed a distinct profile of lower white matter integrity that may increase vulnerability to developing AD later in life. Each CLU-C allele was associated with lower FA in frontal, temporal, parietal, occipital, and subcortical white matter. Brain regions with lower FA included corticocortical pathways previously demonstrated to have lower FA in AD patients and APOE4 carriers. CLU-C related variability found here might create a local vulnerability important for disease onset. These effects are remarkable as they already exist early in life and are associated with a risk gene that is very prevalent (~36% of Caucasians carry two copies of the risk conferring genetic variant CLU-C.) Quantitative mapping of structural brain differences in those at genetic risk of AD is crucial for evaluating treatment and prevention strategies. If the risk for AD is identified, appropriate changes in lifestyle may limit the apprehension of AD; exercise and body mass index-have an effect on brain structure and the level of brain atrophy

=== Biomarkers and Alzheimer's spectrum ===
If suitable biomarkers are found and applied in clinical use, we will be able to give the diagnosis of the AD spectrum at an even earlier stage. In the proposal, the AD spectrum is divided into the three stages (i) the preclinical stage; (ii) mild cognitive impairment; and (iii) clinical AD. In the preclinical stage, only changes in a specific biomarker are observed with neither cognitive impairment nor clinical signs of AD. The mild cognitive impairment stage may include those showing biomarker changes as well as mild cognitive decline but no clinical signs and symptoms of AD. AD is diagnosed in patients with biomarker changes and clinical signs and symptoms of AD. This concept will promote understanding of the continuous transition from preclinical stage to AD via mild cognitive impairment, in which biomarkers can be utilized to discriminate and clearly define each stage of the AD spectrum. The new criteria will promote earlier detection of the subjects who will develop AD in later life, and also to initiate intervention aiming for the prevention of AD.

== Future ==
Imaging genetics must develop methods that will allow relating the effects of a large number of genetic variants on equally multi-dimensional neuroimaging phenotypes. Additionally, the field of imaging epigenetics is emerging with particular relevance, for example, to the understanding of intergenerational transmission of trauma-related psychopathology and related disturbances of maternal care.

== Problems ==
Medication, hospitalization history, or associated behaviors ranging such as smoking can affect imaging. Reviews have identified small sample sizes, limited replication, and difficulty harmonizing neuroimaging phenotypes across studies as major problems in imaging genetics. Candidate-gene imaging studies are also vulnerable to false positives without strict multiple-testing correction, and low-powered early imaging GWAS helped motivate large meta-analytic collaborations such as ENIGMA to improve reproducibility and harmonize analyses across datasets.
