= Empathy in autistic people =

Empathy in autistic individuals is considered a complex topic studied within research on autism spectrum disorder (ASD).

In 1985, British researchers Simon Baron-Cohen and Uta Frith proposed the absence of theory of mind, defined as the inability of autistic individuals to understand the intentions and emotions of others, as a framework for understanding ASD symptoms. Later studies indicated that autistic people are not devoid of empathy, but that their empathy is often based on conscious cognitive processes and logical associations, with less emphasis on social acceptability, unlike the more automatic, socially driven processes observed in non-autistic individuals. Possible explanations have included the presence of alexithymia, differences in mirror neuron activity, variations in amygdala function, or an imbalance between heightened affective empathy and reduced cognitive empathy. In addition, recent studies have shown autistic people may empathize better with other autistic people.

== Definition and description ==
According to Peter Vermeulen, empathy is the "ability to see the world through someone else's eyes" (Note: As Tantam 2012, p. 228, notes, it is important to distinguish between empathy and sympathy, or compassion, because many people (including those with autism) who lack empathy can still show sympathy.) and encompasses both cognitive and affective components. Cognitive empathy involves understanding another person's perspective, while affective empathy refers to experiencing an emotion in response to perceiving an emotional element. Three prerequisites are considered necessary for empathy: recognizing the expression of others' feelings, understanding their perspective (cognitive empathy or theory of mind), and reacting appropriately by sharing the same emotion (affective empathy). Researchers distinguish several forms of empathy based on the processes involved, including cognitive, emotional, and somatic empathy.

Autistic individuals often display emotional particularities that influence their social relationships. Qualitative differences in social interaction are a core feature of autism, as noted by British psychopathologist R. Peter Hobson (1993). Empathy is considered essential for effective social relationships, and several researchers have described autism as a "disorder of empathy" and social reciprocity, particularly in childhood autism. Autistic individuals are generally characterized as "having difficulty with empathy", facing challenges in both recognizing others' emotions and expressing their own, whether verbally or nonverbally. They may also struggle to identify their own emotions, particularly complex ones such as pride or embarrassment, and to interpret facial expressions. Empathy-related assessments in the Autism Spectrum Quotient (ASQ) are among the tools used in diagnosing autism.

Cognitive empathy overlaps with theory of mind, and the terms are often used interchangeably. However, due to the limited number of studies comparing different types of empathy in autistic individuals, it remains unclear whether they are equivalent.

The belief that autistic people entirely lack empathy is still common. British psychologist Tony Attwood has challenged this view, particularly in relation to Asperger's syndrome:

It is important to understand that the person with Asperger's has immature or reduced ToM skills and empathy, but not an absence of empathy. To imply an absence of empathy would be a terrible insult to people with Asperger's, with the corollary that they cannot know or care about the feelings of others. They are not able to recognize the subtle signals of emotional states, or to 'read' complex states of mind.

— Tony Attwood, Le Syndrome d'Asperger, guide complet

In Autism: Explaining the Enigma, British psychologist Uta Frith states that most autistic individuals have autonomous empathic reactions and "know not to appear indifferent to the pain experienced by others". Laboratory tests may not accurately measure their empathy, as performance in controlled settings is often better than in real-life situations. According to French psychoanalyst Jacques Hochmann, the diversity within autism spectrum disorders (ASD)—which include individuals "profoundly deficient in intellectual capacities" as well as those "highly intelligent"—complicates assessment. Most research on empathy has been conducted with individuals "without associated intellectual disability".

The "lack of empathy" is also observed in individuals described as narcissistic or psychopathic (or "antisocial"), though its nature and causes appear to differ.

British psychiatrist Lorna Wing suggests that individuals with difficulties in empathy and social sensitivity form a group that is difficult to classify, with some regarded as disabled and others not.

=== Nature of autistic empathy ===
Several specialists have reported examples of empathy in autistic individuals. Peter Vermeulen describes the case of a 12-year-old verbal autistic girl who, upon seeing a classmate crying, told her educator that the girl was making a "funny noise", indicating difficulty in understanding the meaning of sobbing and tears. He also notes that autistic people may display compassionate behavior when they can understand another person's feelings, often through personal experience. Uta Frith cites the example of an autistic individual who, after reading about a community suffering from hunger, felt empathy due to having personally experienced hunger.

Researchers have examined differences between the empathy of autistic and non-autistic individuals. The distinct form of empathy in autistic people is not considered a conscious choice to disregard others' emotions, but rather a set of particularities in automatic information processing. These include difficulty recognizing emotions and corresponding responses, different prioritization of information—often placing less emphasis on social cues—and slower processing of such information.

According to Vermeulen, behaviors in autistic children aimed at consoling or deliberately annoying others—sometimes observed as early as age two—indicate the early presence of a form of empathy. When placed in situations requiring empathy, autistic individuals often provide responses that are less socially oriented, relying on logic and concrete facts without considering potential discomfort. This may include discussing sensitive topics, such as death, or making candid remarks about another person's appearance, thereby breaking social politeness norms. Difficulties in empathy among autistic individuals appear to be linked to challenges in determining what is socially acceptable, with limited consideration of others' feelings, reactions, and perspectives. This also influences language use.

Peter Vermeulen concludes that most visible displays of empathy in autistic individuals are based on egocentrism, requiring personal experience of the other person's emotional situation or knowledge of it through books or television. They may have difficulty spontaneously showing empathy toward unfamiliar situations. Behaviors considered non-empathetic or socially unacceptable— even when repeated—rarely stem from an intent to annoy, harm, or manipulate, but rather from a lack of anticipation of their impact on others.

In 2018, a study on socialization among autistic individuals during video game sessions, involving 30 participants, concluded that intersubjectivity plays an important role, with autistic people exhibiting their own forms of socialization and empathy that are not considered pathological. According to French psychologist Jérôme Lichté, observed empathy deficits in autistic individuals may result from a response bias that uses neurotypical empathy and socialization as the standard. This view was reinforced by a 2020 "double empathy" study, which found that autistic children could recognize acts of kindness among themselves, while non-autistic children were unable to identify such acts in autistic children.

A Japanese study published in October 2014, involving 15 autistic individuals and a control group, suggested that empathy between autistic individuals may be greater than empathy from autistic individuals toward neurotypical individuals.

=== Contribution of moral sense ===
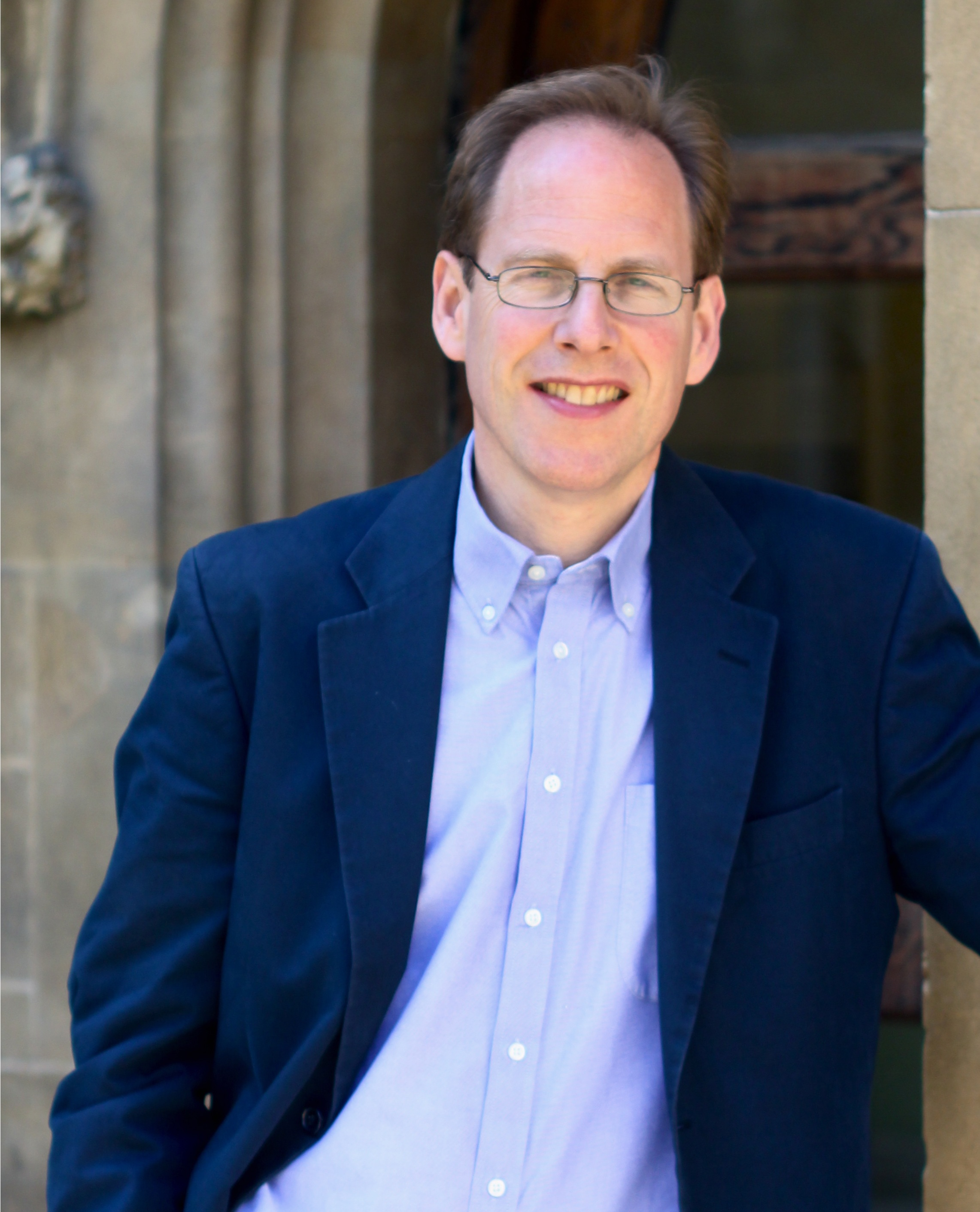
According to Simon Baron-Cohen (and other researchers), the empathy of autistic people differs from that of psychopaths.

==== Psychiatric context ====
In forensic psychiatry, which addresses crimes and offenses, autism has sometimes been mistakenly associated in public opinion with psychopathy or antisocial personality disorder. Due to the presumed lack of empathy, autistic individuals have been suspected of lacking moral sense. Research has since shown that autistic people possess moral sense and are concerned about the suffering of others.

The association between autism and psychopathy is rejected by many researchers and autistic individuals. Citing several studies, Peter Vermeulen states that, unlike psychopaths, autistic people care about others' emotions, are sensitive to death, and respect moral rules. While both may appear to lack empathy, the underlying reasons differ: psychopaths are indifferent to others' emotions, whereas autistic individuals may be unaware of social rules and appear socially clumsy. Uta Frith, citing studies by James Blair comparing the reactions of psychopaths and autistic people, notes that psychopathic children perform above average for their age in attributing mental states to others, unlike autistic children. She concludes that autism and psychopathy are "two different disorders".

Simon Baron-Cohen emphasizes the distinction between the empathy characteristics of autism and those of psychopathy. In Zero Degrees of Empathy: A New Theory of Human Cruelty, he differentiates between negative zero, associated with psychopathic personalities lacking moral sense, and positive zero, associated with people with autism spectrum disorder (ASD). According to him, positive zero is characterized by reduced empathy alongside a greater ability to recognize recurring patterns and to systemize, which supports access to moral sense.

==== Differences in mobilization and expression ====
According to philosopher Sarah Arnaud, autistic people generally possess moral qualities: "these particularities [in the functioning of empathy] in no way prevent them from being part of the moral community. Autistic people can be rigorous moral agents, meaning they show a certain intransigence and moral inflexibility." She notes that these qualities are based on "an overuse of deliberate, rule-based cognitive reasoning rather than automatic processes". Temple Grandin is cited as an example of someone who "voluntarily and with interest built a morality applicable to life in society" through a system of conduct rules. Many autistic individuals exhibit a strong sense of justice and fairness, often grounded in rule-based reasoning rather than emotional cues, which can explain the inflexible social rules they may follow. Uta Frith mentions philanthropist John Howard, a prison reformer retrospectively diagnosed with Asperger's syndrome, who intervened when witnessing injustice and was severely punished. British psychiatrist Digby Tantam observes that autistic people are often idealists who care deeply about cruelty worldwide, sometimes becoming visibly upset by accounts of mistreated people or animals. However, their strict adherence to rules can occasionally lead them to act in ways perceived as cruel to avoid disobedience.

Theory of mind has a direct influence on self-awareness. According to Uta Frith and Francesca Happé, individuals diagnosed with Asperger's syndrome may have a form of self-awareness that differs from that of non-autistic individuals, relying more on intelligence and experience than on intuition. This type of self-awareness is described as being closer to that of a philosopher. Tony Attwood supports this perspective and cites autobiographies with qualities he characterizes as "almost philosophical". A study by Simon Baron-Cohen suggests that differences in empathy influence self-awareness, as the two domains are interconnected.

== History ==
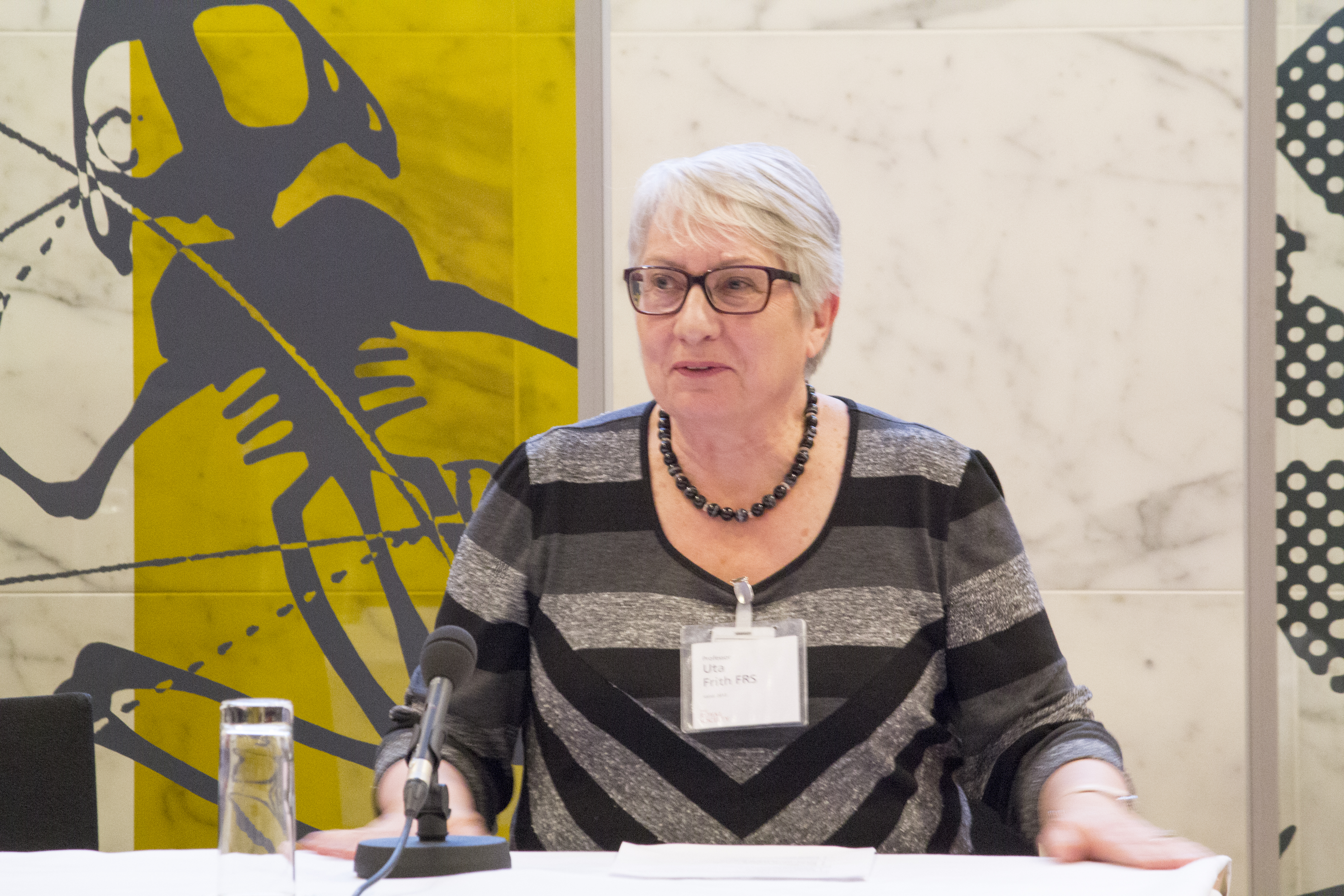
Uta Frith, a British researcher who pioneered early research on autistic empathy

In his first description of Asperger's syndrome in 1943, Hans Asperger stated that the children he studied "lack empathy". Leo Kanner, who identified infantile autism, initially hypothesized that autistic children lacked empathy because they had not received it from their parents, particularly their mothers. This hypothesis, later abandoned by Kanner, was popularized internationally by Bruno Bettelheim in The Empty Fortress (1967) and adopted by many psychoanalysts, particularly in France, before being rejected. Historically, some individuals may have been studied for empathy-related traits without receiving an autism diagnosis. For example, Eva Ssuchareva (1926) and later Wolff and Chess (1964) examined children diagnosed with schizoid personality disorder, whose described behaviors and empathy closely resembled what would later be identified as Asperger's syndrome.

In his 1993 monograph, British psychologist R. Peter Hobson compared the empathy of an autistic person to that of a chimpanzee.

A major scientific debate on the empathy of autistic individuals began in 1985 with the publication of the article Does the autistic child have a "theory of mind"? by Simon Baron-Cohen, A. M. Leslie, and Uta Frith. Based on their initial experiments, the authors concluded that there is a specific and persistent empathy deficit in autism, independent of intellectual ability. They stated that "our results strongly support the hypothesis that autistic children considered as a group fail to employ theory of mind." Baron-Cohen later used the term "mindblindness" to describe this concept. The article generated significant interest in the field and led to numerous subsequent studies. This theory remains one of the most widely known regarding empathy in autism.

In 1992, a study compared 18 autistic children "without intellectual disability" to a group of non-autistic children. Participants were asked questions about their own emotions, the interpretation of others' emotions, and the reasons for those emotions. The autistic group scored lower on all three measures. They also took more time to respond and displayed expressions of concentration, suggesting that their answers required additional analysis. Among autistic participants, higher IQ scores were associated with better performance, whereas no such correlation was observed in the non-autistic group.

In 2004, British researcher Uta Frith examined Asperger's syndrome, stating: "Experimental evidence suggests that individuals with Asperger syndrome may lack an intuitive theory of mind (mentalising), but may be able to acquire an explicit theory of mind." At that time, Asperger's syndrome was regarded as a distinct form of autism. With the publication of the DSM-5 in 2013, the diagnosis was merged into the broader category of autism spectrum disorder (ASD), which includes among its diagnostic criteria a deficit in "socio-emotional reciprocity".

In recent years, most research has focused on theory of mind and cognitive empathy in autistic children and adolescents. Few studies have examined behavioral responses to others' emotions, and none have investigated whether autistic children are sensitive to emotional contagion, such as laughing when others in the same room laugh.

== Causes and theories ==
Several neurological and psychological explanations have been proposed for empathy in autism, including theory of mind, alexithymia, mirror neurons, the amygdala, the empathizing–systemizing theory, psychoanalysis, and anthropocentrism. While a deficit in social cognition may account for some difficulties associated with autism, it is unlikely to explain all characteristics observed in individuals with autism spectrum disorders. Empathic responses in autistic people also vary according to individual temperament. Because autism is diagnosed more frequently in boys than in girls, some researchers have suggested that boys may be more susceptible due to "brains naturally lacking certain circuits necessary for empathy". Digby Tantam proposes that autistic individuals may not experience emotional contagion, which develops through the ability to imitate non-verbal communication, particularly facial expressions. This does not necessarily indicate a lack of cognitive empathy but may reflect reduced awareness of emotion perception, as attention is directed toward understanding speech and formulating responses. Tantam also suggests that difficulties with affective empathy may be related to reduced eye contact, a hypothesis also considered by psychiatrist Danielle Bons and her team.

=== Theory of mind, cognitive empathy, and affective empathy ===
The theory of mind hypothesis, also called the "social cognition hypothesis", proposes that autism spectrum disorders are largely the result of an absence or impairment of theory of mind. Research has frequently suggested that autistic individuals may have difficulty understanding others' perspectives and intentions. Theory of mind is associated with structures in the temporal lobe and the prefrontal cortex, while empathy—the capacity to share others' feelings—involves cortical sensory areas as well as limbic and paralimbic structures. Simon Baron-Cohen has suggested that individuals with classic autism often exhibit reduced cognitive and affective empathy. According to Dutch psychologist Anke M. Scheeren, test results in this area often correlate with the presence or absence of language, indicating that nonverbal autistic individuals may have different forms of mental reasoning. This suggests a possible relationship between empathy and language proficiency.

==== Autism without intellectual disability ====
The lack of clear distinction between theory of mind and empathy may have contributed to an incomplete understanding of the empathic abilities of autistic individuals, particularly those diagnosed with Asperger's syndrome. Many reports on the "empathic deficits" associated with Asperger's syndrome are based on the assumption of a theory of mind deficit.

Peter Vermeulen argues that "people with autism, especially the most intelligent ones, do not so much suffer from a deficit in theory of mind, but rather from a deficit in 'intuition' of the mind." He further states that "given the efforts that autistic people make to understand the inner world of others, one could even say that they are the only ones who truly possess a theory of mind." Approximately one-fifth of autistic children aged 4 and 5 pass the Sally–Anne test. Anke M. Scheeren also rejects the idea of a permanent theory of mind deficit, citing studies on children and adolescents described as "without intellectual disability". Adolescents perform better than children, likely compensating for earlier difficulties and developing "advanced mental reasoning". This view suggests that experience and learning enable autistic individuals to acquire theory of mind, with some understanding complex emotional states such as sarcasm and double bluff. Research also indicates that people diagnosed with Asperger's syndrome may have difficulty understanding others' perspectives, but on average demonstrate equal or greater empathy and personal distress compared to control groups.

==== Imbalance between cognitive empathy and affective empathy ====
In 2009, Scottish psychologist Adam Smith proposed the "empathy imbalance hypothesis" (EIH) in relation to autism. According to this hypothesis, individuals on the autism spectrum exhibit a deficit in "cognitive empathy" alongside an excess of "emotional empathy". This imbalance may result in empathic over-arousal, leading to emotional overload and contributing to difficulties in social relationships. The EIH is considered compatible with the theory of mind framework, and the idea of heightened emotional empathy is frequently reported in autistic autobiographical accounts, with a growing body of empirical evidence supporting it.

This theory contrasts with the view that autism spectrum disorders (ASD) are associated with a lack of empathy and with the "extreme male brain" hypothesis, which is supported by essayist and activist Ralph James Savarese.

Self-assessment studies indicate that individuals with ASD generally report lower empathy, limited or absent comforting responses toward others in distress, but equal or higher levels of personal distress compared to control groups. The combination of reduced empathy and increased personal distress may contribute to the lower overall empathy observed in these studies. Many autistic accounts describe strong emotional empathy. For instance, Jim Sinclair reported feeling helpless and highly uncomfortable when witnessing another person's distress. Additionally, autistic individuals with synesthesia may experience heightened perception of certain shapes, textures, colors, and specific words or numbers, which has been interpreted as a form of emotional empathy extending to animals, concepts, or objects.

Personal distress, reported as generally higher among autistic individuals, has been proposed as a possible explanation for the observation that some may exhibit heightened emotional empathy. In a controlled study of 38 individuals diagnosed with Asperger's syndrome, participants scored lower in cognitive empathy but within the average range for affective empathy. The differences were most evident in the recognition of positive emotions.

=== Alexithymia ===
In 2004, a study of "high-functioning" autistic individuals reported a high prevalence of alexithymia, a personality construct characterized by difficulty in recognizing and expressing one's own emotions and those of others. Two functional magnetic resonance imaging studies indicated that alexithymia may be responsible for reduced empathy in individuals with ASD. The lack of empathic attunement associated with alexithymia can negatively affect the quality and satisfaction of relationships. A 2010 neurological study suggested that empathy deficits in autism may be attributable to the high comorbidity between alexithymia and autism spectrum disorders, rather than to a permanent social deficit.

=== Empathy–systemizing and hypermasculine brain ===
Simon Baron-Cohen's empathy–systemizing (E–S) theory classifies individuals along two independent dimensions: empathy (E) and systemizing (S). These abilities are assessed through tests producing an empathy quotient (EQ) and a systemizing quotient (SQ). Based on these scores, five brain types are proposed, which are hypothesized to correlate with neuronal differences. In this framework, autism is associated with below-average empathy and average or above-average systemizing. Baron-Cohen's research also indicates that autistic men generally score lower in empathy than autistic women. The E–S theory was later extended into the "hypermasculine brain theory", which proposes that individuals with ASD are more likely to exhibit a hypermasculine brain type, characterized by above-average systemizing and reduced empathy.

The hypermasculine brain theory proposes that individuals with ASD are more specialized in systemizing than in empathy. It suggests that elevated exposure to testosterone in utero may contribute to both the development of autistic traits and the higher prevalence of autism in males. Certain neuroanatomical features in autistic individuals have been reported to align with an extreme male profile, potentially influenced by prenatal testosterone levels rather than biological sex alone. A neuroimaging study of 120 men and women found that autistic women's brain structures more closely resembled those of non-autistic men than those of non-autistic women, while a comparable difference was not observed in autistic men.

The hypermasculine brain theory does not account for all characteristics of autism and has been subject to criticism. Research has shown that autistic boys with lower measured intrauterine testosterone levels do not exhibit fewer autistic traits, and autistic men generally do not display behaviors typically associated with hypermasculinity, (Note: This is particularly evident in certain high-profile men with autism, such as Hugo Horiot, Josef Schovanec, and Daniel Tammet.) such as aggressiveness or use of force. Peter Vermeulen disputes the dichotomy between empathy and systemizing proposed by Simon Baron-Cohen, arguing that systemizing is part of the empathy process and that human emotional and cognitive functioning cannot be fully assessed through algorithmic models.

=== Brain particularities ===
Neuroscientific research has examined whether autistic empathy may be linked to differences in brain structure. A 2010 study involving 15 adolescents reported reduced activation of the fusiform gyrus.

==== Mirror neurons ====
The mirror neuron system plays a role in emotional empathy. A 2005 study found that high-functioning autistic children showed reduced mirror neuron activity in the inferior frontal gyrus (pars opercularis) during imitation tasks and when observing emotional expressions. Electroencephalography indicated a markedly reduced mu rhythm in the sensory cortex of autistic individuals, with activity inversely correlated to the severity of social symptoms. These findings suggest that a dysfunctional mirror neuron network may contribute to the social and communication difficulties associated with autism, including impairments in theory of mind and empathy.

These findings are disputed. Cognitive scientist Nicolas Georgieff argues that most available experimental data do not indicate alterations in the mirror neuron system in autistic individuals. He also notes that other brain regions contribute to empathy, and that mirror neuron dysfunction alone cannot account for autistic empathy.

==== Amygdala ====
3D view of the amygdala (in red)

The amygdala and cerebral cortex play roles in recognizing emotions and initiating emotional responses. Some studies have suggested that amygdala dysfunction may contribute to difficulties in recognizing others' emotions. However, autistic individuals do not exhibit clear lesions in the limbic system. Additionally, the amygdala does not appear to be hyperactivated in anxiety situations, contrary to earlier assumptions. While there may be a link between social motivation in autistic individuals and amygdala function, this factor alone does not provide a full explanation.

=== Reduced social motivation ===
The reduced social motivation theory, developed in social psychology, proposes that autism is characterized not by impaired empathy or theory of mind, but by lower motivation for social interaction. According to this view, such interactions do not produce the same rewarding emotions for autistic individuals—particularly those with limited language skills—as they do for non-autistic individuals. A questionnaire-based study of 23 adolescents found that greater assessed severity of autism correlated with lower social motivation. Research also indicates that autistic individuals generally place less importance on others' opinions of them. The theory has been used to explain discrepancies between autistic individuals' performance on empathy measures in laboratory settings and observations of their behavior in daily life.

=== Psychoanalytic theories ===
French psychologist and psychoanalyst Graciela C. Crespin considers empathy to be a central concept in autism spectrum disorder (ASD). Child psychiatrist and psychoanalyst Jean-Noël Trouvé notes that, despite being discredited by extensive research, including work by psychoanalysts, the "refrigerator mother" theory continues to persist in certain circles of psychopathology.

Psychoanalyst Marie-Christine Laznik, building on the work of Frances Tustin and Geneviève Haag, suggests that autistic individuals may exhibit affective hypersensitivity. She observes that autistic infants "may have hypersensitivity factors that lead them to withdraw from relationships with adults as soon as worrying thoughts arise in the adult's mind, sometimes without the adult realizing it", but also that "autistic children are incapable of empathy with their peers to the point of making social life very difficult for them." She interprets this apparent paradox, drawing on Adam Smith's theory, as an excess of emotional empathy that can become disabling.

Jean-Noël Trouvé hypothesizes "that people who go on to become autistic have difficulties and even give up on building a sense of self based on the dialectic of recognition by the other. In the most severe cases, this demand for recognition is practically absent, with the autistic person seeming primarily concerned with maintaining a sense of self that remains uncertain for them, and even defending it against reciprocal recognition attempts from the environment". In cases of Asperger syndrome, "the demand for recognition is expressed but has a conflictual, discordant character, particularly because of an inability to recognize cues of the other's desire." Trouvé considers autistic individuals to be sensitive to others' feelings and intentions but argues that the "functional and structural capacities needed for their expression" create a "terrible gap" and lead to misunderstanding between autistic and non-autistic people.

=== Non-anthropocentric empathy ===
Autistic individuals often show an early preference for observing objects, animals, or celestial bodies over engaging in human contact or observing faces. A comparative study of 87 autistic and 263 non-autistic individuals found that the personification of objects is more common among autistic people and that such experiences are often perceived as calming. Over time, reduced human contact may contribute to what is commonly described as "empathy difficulties". According to Peter Vermeulen, autistic individuals with high functioning often devote substantial time to special interests and less to family, partners, or friends, with difficulties arising in situations requiring displays of empathy, emotional support, or spontaneity. Evidence of interest in animals, objects, and concepts—toward which empathy can be shown—has been interpreted as indicative of an animistic or "pan-psychic" mindset, defined as the tendency to attribute a "soul" or "spirit" to animals and objects. In non-autistic children, such thinking typically diminishes over time, shifting toward a focus on human relationships.

Ralph James Savarese argues that autistic empathy may extend beyond human beings to encompass all living things and even objects, as illustrated by Temple Grandin's accounts in Animals in Translation and her compassion toward animals, particularly cattle. Grandin's publications and work have contributed to drawing attention to this form of empathy and have reframed the discussion: while autistic individuals may experience difficulties with empathy toward humans, many non-autistic individuals appear to have difficulties with theory of mind toward animals—difficulties not observed in autistic people. Savarese describes autistic empathy as "non-anthropocentric".

== Testimonies from autistic people ==
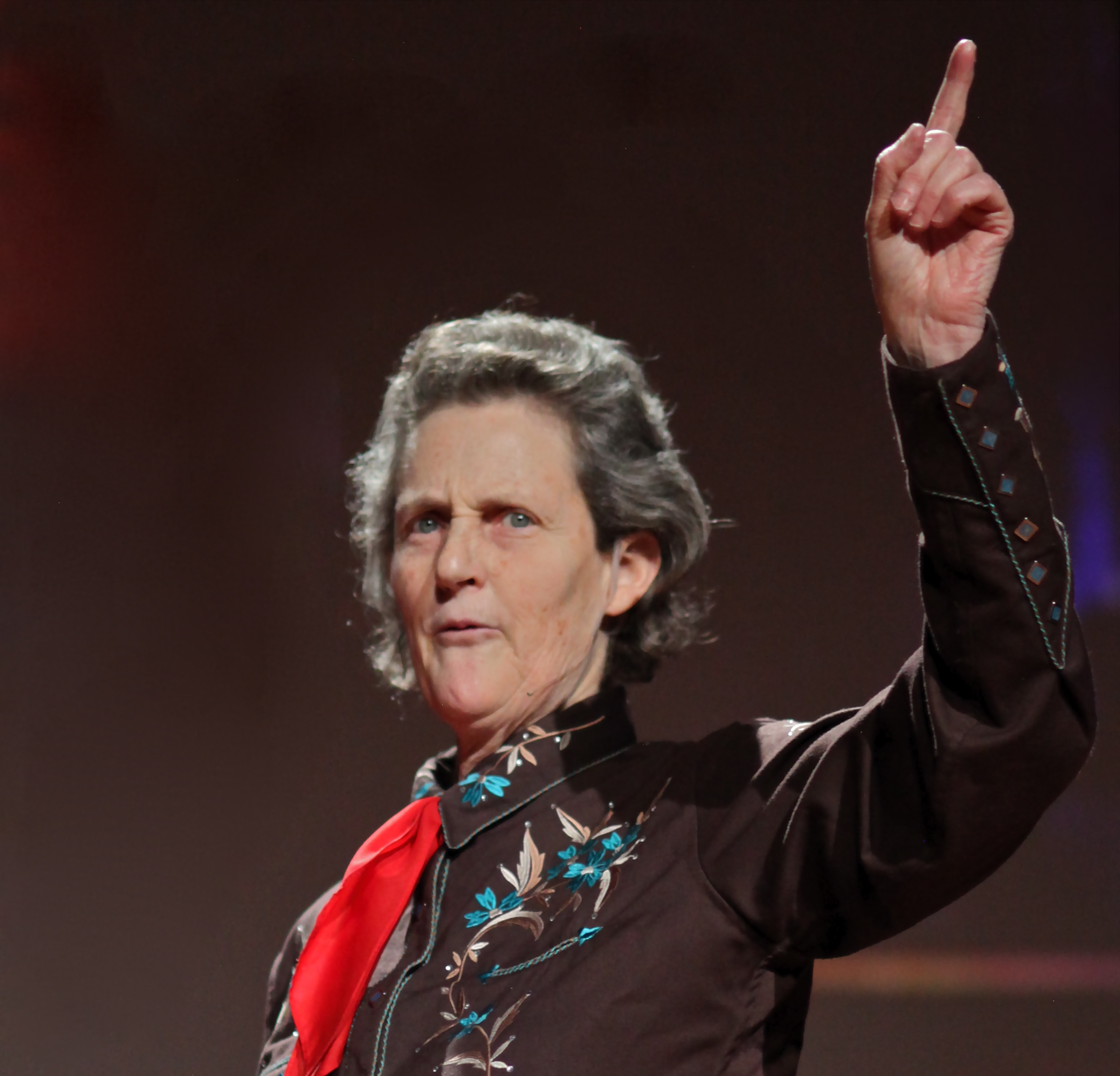
Through her actions and writings, Temple Grandin shows empathy for animals.

Autobiographical accounts by autistic individuals often describe concern for the suffering of others and report experiencing "emotional overload" when confronted with people in distress. However, some accounts also indicate an absence of felt empathy. Stephen M. Shore, an autistic professor, cites numerous testimonies supporting the experience of emotional overload:

A common false belief is that people with Asperger syndrome do not feel emotions or have empathy for others. Many report that they feel too many emotions but have difficulty recognizing the nature of these emotions and how to express them in a way that makes them understandable to non-autistic people.

— Stephen M. Shore, Comprendre l'autisme pour les nuls

Temple Grandin has described how experiencing "too much" affective empathy can be challenging for autistic individuals, as it may lead to sensory and emotional overload. Simon Baron-Cohen notes that autistic people are capable of experiencing deep feelings of love, citing Daniel Tammet's attachment to the number pi as an example. In 2015, autistic philosopher Josef Schovanec published De l'Amour en Autistan, a work inspired by real events and biographies, exploring the emotional lives of autistic people, including physical affection and the love of knowledge and books. Grandin has also described empathy toward cattle, stating that she perceives their calm and fear. Reports of autistic children describe strong attachments to objects, sometimes accompanied by empathy expressed through imagining the object's suffering. Personal accounts frequently mention differences in sensory perception, including hypersensitivity to certain colors, shapes, or lights, as well as synesthesia, which may influence social interaction patterns. Many autistic individuals report that animals, insects, objects, or celestial bodies provide strong and pleasant sensory experiences, while human interactions can involve stimuli (such as noise or odors) perceived as unpleasant, encouraging withdrawal from social contact. On 21 June 2016, the BBC aired the program Things Not to Say to an Autistic Person, in which participants discussed empathy and reported experiencing both empathy and emotional overload.

Donna Williams, in her autobiography, describes a form of "sensory empathy", characterized by a heightened sensory perception enabling one to resonate with and adopt another person's perspective. She considers this type of empathy to be strong in autistic individuals but often weak or absent in non-autistic individuals. Temple Grandin reports a similar phenomenon, explaining that to "empathize", she visualizes herself in another person's position to understand their perceptions and problems, and suggests that non-autistic people lack this "visual empathy". Gunilla Gerland recounts that from a young age she could "see and feel the terror of others" and empathize with those who had been harmed or mistreated, partly due to her own similar experiences. Other testimonies indicate that some autistic individuals feel the emotions of people around them and are affected by negative emotional states nearby. Caregivers of autistic children have also reported that their own emotional states appear to influence the child's behavior, with the child often mirroring the caregiver's emotions.

According to Ralph James Savarese, the writings of Tito Mukhopadhyay, a nonverbal autistic author with synesthesia, challenge the belief that all autistic individuals, particularly nonverbal ones, lack empathy. His works describe colors, smells, and insects with emotional detail and express concern for the experiences of living beings, especially non-human ones.

== Compensation for difficulties and social perception of autistic empathy ==
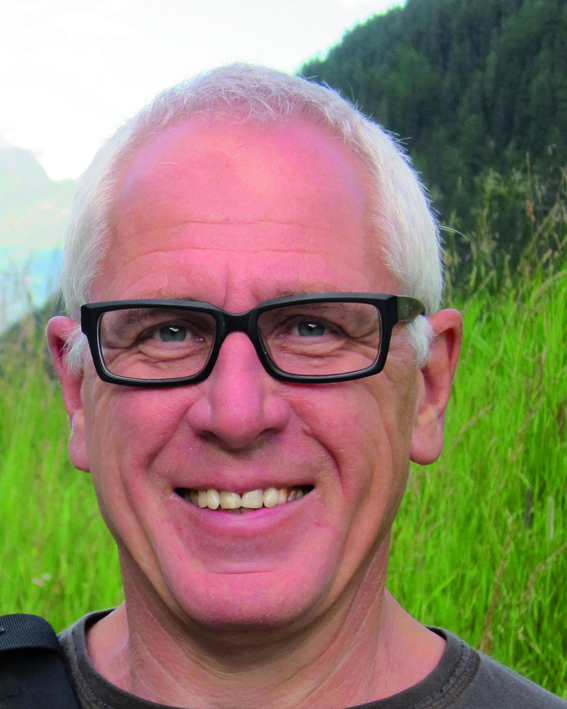
Peter Vermeulen, author of Autism and Emotions

According to Peter Vermeulen, autistic individuals with strong concentration abilities may compensate for empathy difficulties to the extent that they become unnoticeable to others. This process requires learning, sustained effort, time, and appropriate guidance, and involves continuous intellectual work during social interactions, unlike the spontaneous processes of non-autistic individuals. Training programs exist to develop social skills, including methods such as the "three figures game", which are considered suitable for fostering empathy. There is no dedicated empirical research measuring improvements in empathy from such training, although practical experiments suggest that learning social scenarios can be effective. Regular social contact is considered a prerequisite for developing empathy skills, as autistic individuals with significant social and emotional difficulties are often those who have been deprived of social interaction. A lack of early sensory stimulation may contribute to more severe empathy impairments.

Some highly intelligent autistic individuals may develop what is described as "intellectual empathy" through the study of various forms of expression, such as art, music, and literature, enabling them to understand emotions through logic and rationalization. Such individuals may appear highly empathetic, but their responses can rely on recalling previously experienced scenarios, sometimes described as "libraries of situations", which help them deduce others' emotions. Temple Grandin, in her book Thinking in Pictures, states that she is "not capable of more empathy than an animal", but that accumulated experience from interactions with others has significantly improved her social skills. She reports memorizing extensive collections of emotional social situations, which allow her to respond appropriately to others' emotions by drawing on situational associations and logical reasoning.

In general, those interacting with autistic individuals may misinterpret their difficulties with empathy as deliberate selfishness, rudeness, or indifference. M'Hammed Sajidi, president of the French association Vaincre l'autisme, states that autistic people have "no empathy at birth". Peter Vermeulen notes that the frequent criticism of autistic people for "lacking empathy" overlooks the fact that it is a component of their disability, comparing it to reproaching a blind person for being unable to see. Advocates of neurodiversity increasingly challenge the way non-autistic individuals ("neurotypicals") perceive autistic functioning, highlighting the difficulties caused by this lack of understanding and "lack of respect for their difference". Ralph James Savarese emphasizes the importance of accurately defining autistic empathy, noting that it is not an attachment disorder or an absence of feelings for others, but a difficulty in identifying emotional states, particularly in verbalizing them.

The association between autism and a lack of empathy is frequently depicted in literature and other cultural works. In The Curious Incident of the Dog in the Night-Time, a novel by Mark Haddon, the main character is portrayed as lacking cognitive empathy, in the sense that he is unable to care about the well-being or feelings of others.

== Bibliography ==
- Arnaud, Sarah (2016). "Trouble du spectre de l'autisme : Une agentivité morale objective, rigoriste et émotionnelle" [Autism spectrum disorder: Objective, rigorous, and emotional moral agency] (PDF). BioéthiqueOnline (in French). ISSN 1923-2799.
- Attwood, Tony (2010). Le syndrome d'Asperger : Guide complet [Asperger Syndrome: A Comprehensive Guide]. Questions de personne. Série TED (in French) (3rd ed.). Brussels: De Boeck. ISBN 978-2-8041-6269-6. Archived from the original on June 5, 2018.
- Baron-Cohen, Simon (1997). Mindblindness : An Essay on Autism and Theory of Mind. MIT Press. ISBN 026252225X.
- Baron-Cohen, Simon (2011). Zero Degrees of Empathy : A New Theory of Human Cruelty. Penguin UK. ISBN 9780713997910.
- Bogdashina, Olga (2013). Autism and Spirituality : Psyche, Self and Spirit in People on the Autism Spectrum. Jessica Kingsley Publishers. ISBN 978-0857005915.
- Crespin, Graciela (2015). "Quelle empathie pour les autistes ?" [What empathy for autistic people?]. Cahiers de PréAut (in French). 112. ISSN 1767-3151.
- Danion-Grillat, A; Bursztejn, C (2011). Psychiatrie de l'enfant [Child psychiatry] (in French). Paris: Lavoisier MSP. ISBN 978-2257204066.
- Debot-Sevrin, Marie-Rose (2015). Des enfants du spectre autistique et l'émotion [Children on the Autism Spectrum and Emotion] (in French). L'Harmattan. ISBN 978-2336386546.
- Frith, Uta (2010). L' Énigme de l'autisme [The Enigma of Autism] (in French). Odile Jacob. ISBN 978-2738192578.
- Georgieff, Nicolas (2014). Qu'est-ce que l'autisme ? [What is autism?]. Les Topos (in French). Dunod. ISBN 978-2100711789.
- Gepner, Bruno; Tardif, Carole (2016). "Empathie et autisme : une question subtile, un enjeu important" [Empathy and autism: a subtle issue, an important challenge]. Empathie autour de la naissance [Empathy around childbirth] (in French). Toulouse: Éditions Erès. pp. 207‑220.
- Rehfeldt, Ruth Anne; Barnes-Holmes, Yvonne (2009). Derived Relational Responding Applications for Learners with Autism and Other Developmental Disabilities : A Progressive Guide to Change. New Harbinger Publications. ISBN 978-1608826391.
- Savarese, Ralph James (2014). "Autism, Empathy, and the trope of civilization". Rethinking Empathy Through Literature. Routledge Interdisciplinary Perspectives on Literature. Routledge. ISBN 978-1317817376.
- Scheeren, Anke (2012). Reconsidering core impairments in autism : Diversity in empathy and social behavior (PDF). Amsterdam: Ipskamp Drukkers B.V. ISBN 978-94-6191-455-2. Archived from the original (PDF) on August 16, 2016.
- Tantam, Digby (2012). "Nonverbal communication, empathy and Theory of Mind". Autism Spectrum Disorders Through the Life Span. Jessica Kingsley Publishers. ISBN 978-1843109938.
- Tardif, Carole (2010). Autisme et pratiques d'intervention [Autism and intervention practices]. Psychologie (in French). Marseille: Groupe de Boeck. ISBN 978-2353271023.
- Vermeulen, Peter (2009). Autisme et émotions [Autism and emotions]. Questions de personne. Série TED (in French). Brussels: De Boeck Supérieur. ISBN 978-2804103941.
- Vermeulen, Peter (2013). Comprendre les personnes autistes de haut niveau : Le syndrome d'Asperger à l'épreuve de la clinique [Understanding high-functioning autistic individuals: Asperger syndrome put to the test in clinical practice] (in French) (2nd ed.). Éditions Dunod. ISBN 978-2-10-070134-6.
- Zimmerman (2008). Autism : Current Theories and Evidence [Understanding high-functioning autistic individuals: Asperger syndrome put to the test in clinical practice] (in French). Baltimore, Maryland: Humana Press. ISBN 978-1-60327-488-3. LCCN 2008935824.
