= Fliess =

Fliess may refer to:

== Places ==
- Fließ, a town in Tyrol, Austria
- Fliess Bay, a bay in Joinville island off the Palmer Peninsula of Antarctica
- Tegeler Fließ, a creek or river in Brandenburg, Germany
- Schweinitzer Fließ, a creek or river in Brandenburg, Germany
- Sydower Fließ, a municipality in Brandenburg, Germany

== People ==
- André Fliess, German footballer
- Robert Fliess, psychoanalyst, son of Wilhelm
- Sue Fliess, American author
- Wilhelm Fliess, German psychologist and friend of Sigmund Freud
