= Francesca Happé =

British neuroscientist

Francesca Happé CBE FBA FMedSci
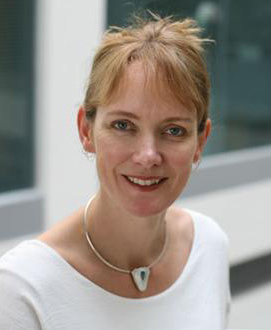
- Francesca Happé
- Born: Francesca Gabrielle Elizabeth Happé; 1967 (age 58–59); Cambridge, England, UK
- Education: University of Oxford (BA); University College London (PhD)
- Known for: Research on autism spectrum conditions
- Awards: Rosalind Franklin Award (2011)
- Scientific career
- Fields: Autism spectrum; Neurodevelopmental disorders; Social cognition; Cognitive style
- Workplaces: King's College London
- Thesis: Theory of Mind and Communication in Autism (1991)
- Doctoral advisor: Uta Frith
- Doctoral students: Essi Viding
- Website: kclpure.kcl.ac.uk/portal/francesca.happe.html

Francesca Gabrielle Elizabeth Happé (born 1967) is a British neuroscientist who is Professor of Cognitive Neuroscience and former Director of the MRC Social, Genetic and Developmental Psychiatry Centre at the Institute of Psychiatry, Psychology and Neuroscience, King's College London. Her research concerns autism spectrum conditions, specifically the understanding social cognitive processes in these conditions.

== Personal life and education ==
Happé has stated that her grandfather worked as a scientist for Technicolor, and "made some real innovations" and that her parents always encouraged her to "ask questions".

Happé read Experimental Psychology at Corpus Christi College, Oxford in the mid-1980s and was inspired about autism by the lectures she attended as an undergraduate. Through her tutor she was able to join a research project led by Neil O'Connor and Beate Hermelin about autism during a summer vacation. She planned to take a PhD at Oxford, but was directed to meet Uta Frith. This led to a change in the course of her life so that she studied for a PhD related to autism at University College London supervised by Frith and supported by a Medical Research Council Studentship at the Cognitive Development Unit.

== Career and research ==
From 1991 to 1995 Happé worked at the MRC Cognitive Development Unit, before spending a year at the Department of Psychology and Aphasia Research College, Boston College in the USA. Since 1995, she has been employed at the MRC Social, Genetic and Developmental Psychiatry Centre, first as Senior Scientist in Cognitive Psychology (1996-2000), then Reader in Cognitive Neuroscience (2000-2008) and finally Professor of Cognitive Neuroscience since 2008. She was the Director of the MRC SGDP Centre at the Institute of Psychiatry, Psychology and Neuroscience (2012-2020). She co-leads the ReSpect Lab at King's College London with Gavin R. Stewart.

Her work explores how autistic people understand the world. Two significant parts are the discovery that autistic people and their neurotypical relatives may have increased attention to detail and that women and men experience autism differently. She is also interested in their mental health and the consequences of aging. She has used a wide range of methods to demonstrate these aspects, including studies of twins, genetics, the effects of strokes and functional imaging methods as well as traditional psychological approaches. Happé has supervised over 30 doctoral students, including Naomi Fisher (2002), Essi Viding (2004), Gregory L. Wallace (2006), Elizabeth O'Nions (2012), Lucy Livingston (2020) and Gavin R. Stewart (2021).

Her work has been funded by the Wellcome Trust, MRC, Economic and Social Research Council and Autism Speaks.

Happé has been President (2013–15) and a Board Member (2012–16) of the International Society for Autism Research, and she has been a member of the National Autistic Society's "Autism in Maturity" Advisory Group since 2011. From 2013 - 2015 she was President of the International Society for Autism Research. She has several editorial roles, including joint Editor for Journal of Child Psychology and Psychiatry (2000-2006), editorial board member of Journal of Autism and Developmental Disorders (2001-2010) and Mind and Language.

Happé was appointed Commander of the Order of the British Empire (CBE) in the 2021 New Year Honours for services to the study of autism.

== Publications ==
Happe is the author or co-author of over 205 research publications, as well as books on autism for general readers, students, parents and professionals that include:

- Autism: An Introduction to Psychological Theory (1994), which has been translated into several languages.
- Autism: A New Introduction to Psychological Theory and Debate (with Sue Fletcher-Watson)(2019) Routledge
- Girls and Autism: Educational, Family and Personal Perspectives (with Barry Carpenter and Jo Egerton) (2019) Routledge

Her scientific publications include:

- Other minds in the brain: A functional imaging study of "theory of mind" in story comprehension
- Happé, F., Ehlers, S., Fletcher, P., Frith, U., Johansson, M., Gillberg, C., Dolan, R., Frackowiak, R. & Frith, C. (1996) "Theory of mind" in the brain. Evidence from a PET scan study of Asperger syndrome. NeuroReport, 8, 197–201
- Happé, F. (1999) Autism: Cognitive deficit or cognitive style? Trends in Cognitive Sciences, 3, 216–222
- Happé, F., Ronald, A. & Plomin, R. (2006) Time to give up on a single explanation for autism. Nature Neuroscience, 9, 1218–20
- Hallett, V., Ronald, A., Rijsdijk, F. & Happé F. (2010) Association of autistic-like and internalizing traits during childhood: a longitudinal twin study. American Journal of Psychiatry, 167, 809–17
- Charman, T., Jones, C.R., Pickles, A., Simonoff, E., Baird, G. & Happé, F. (2011). Defining the cognitive phenotype of autism. Brain Research, 1380, 10–21
- Robinson, E.B., Koenen, K.C., McCormick, M.C., Munir, K., Hallett, V., Happé, F., Plomin, R. & Ronald, A. (2012). A multivariate twin study of autistic traits in 12-year-olds: testing the fractionable autism triad hypothesis. Behavior Genetics, 42, 245–255
- Dworzynski, K., Ronald, A., Bolton, P. & Happé, F. (2012) How different are girls and boys above and below the diagnostic threshold for autism spectrum disorders? J. American Academy of Child and Adolescent Psychiatry. 51, 788–97
- Robinson, E.B., Lichtenstein, P., Anckarsäter, H., Happé, F. & Ronald, A. (2013) Examining and interpreting the female protective effect against autistic behavior. Proceedings of the National Academy of Sciences. 110, 5258-62
- Mason, D., Stewart, G.R., Capp, S.J. & Happé, F. (2022) Older Age Autism Research: A Rapidly Growing Field, but Still a Long Way to Go. Autism in Adulthood. 4(2), 164-172
- Stewart, G.R. & Happé, F. (2025) Aging Across the Autism Spectrum. Annual Review of Developmental Psychology. 7, 4.1-4.24

She is also the creator of a series of children's science books entitled My Mum's a Scientist.

Happé has appeared in TV and radio programmes and written for the media. This includes BBC QED and Horizon, radio interviews for BBC World Service, BBC and American Broadcasting Company as well as print media such as The Daily Telegraph, The Independent, The Guardian, la Repubblica and New Scientist.

== Awards and honours ==
- Scholarship, Corpus Christi College, Oxford (1987)
- Proxima Accessit to the Chris Welch Science Scholarship (1988)
- Young Science Writer prize (1991) from The Daily Telegraph
- British Psychological Society Spearman Medal (1998)
- Experimental Psychology Society Prize (1999)
- Royal Institution Scientists for the New Century Lecturer (1999)
- Winner, King's College London Supervisory Excellence Award (2011)
- Rosalind Franklin Award (2011) from the Royal Society
- Elected a Fellow of the British Academy (2014)
- Elected Fellow of the Academy of Medical Sciences (FMedSci) (2017)

She was the subject of a Channel 4 documentary in the 4Learning Living Science series entitled A Living Mind, which was accompanied by curriculum materials for 11 to 14 years olds. She was a guest on The Life Scientific on BBC Radio 4 in September 2020.
