= Wilhelm Fliess =

German otolaryngologist (1858–1928)

Wilhelm Fliess Wilhelm Fließ
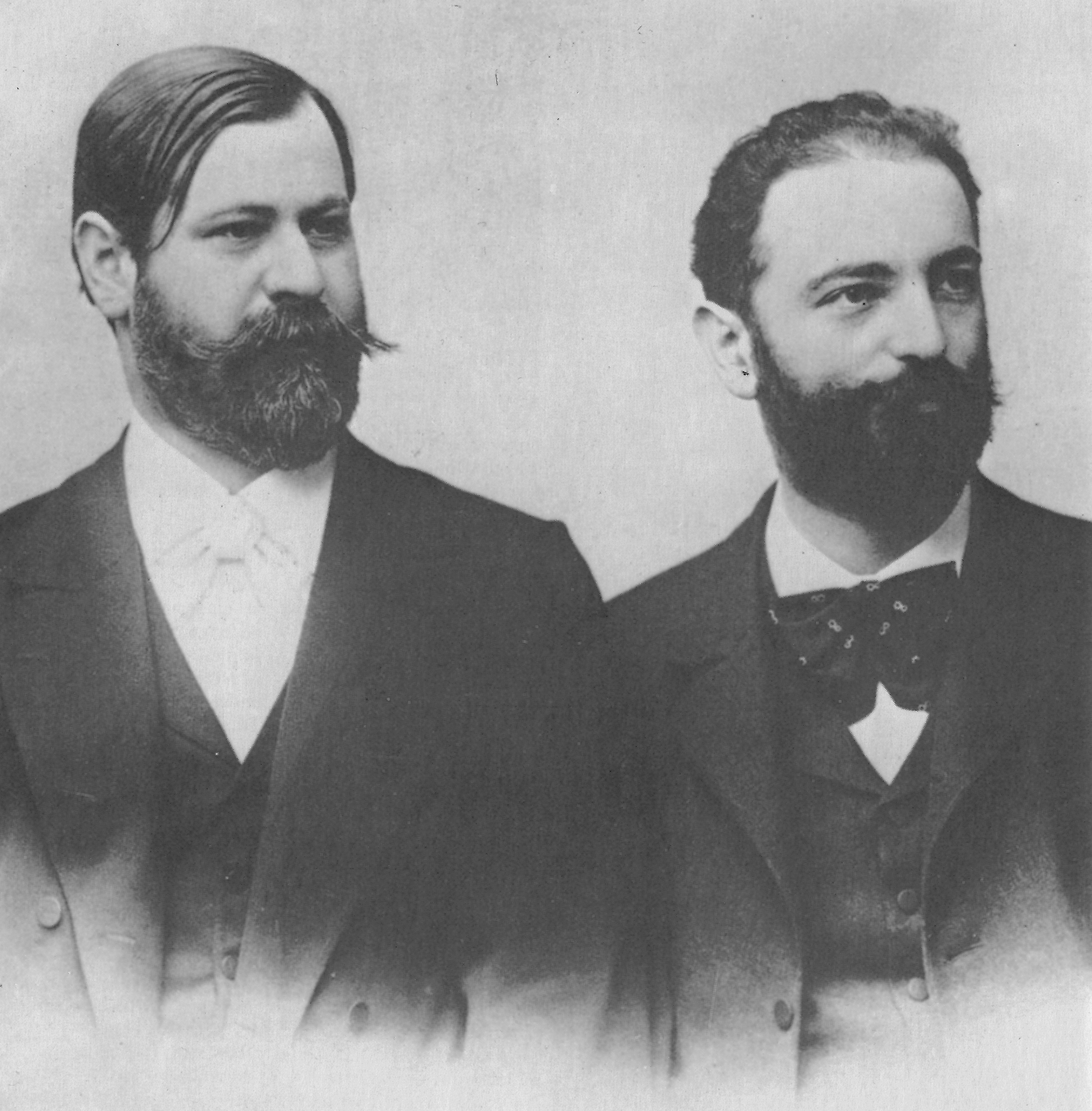
- Fliess (right) and Sigmund Freud in the early 1890s
- Born: 24 October 1858; Arnswalde, Province of Brandenburg, Kingdom of Prussia
- Died: 13 October 1928 (aged 69); Berlin, Province of Brandenburg, Germany
- Scientific career
- Fields: Otolaryngology

Wilhelm Fliess (German: Fließ [fliːs]; 24 October 1858 – 13 October 1928) was a German otolaryngologist who practised in Berlin. He developed the pseudoscientific theory of human biorhythms and a possible nasogenital connection that have not been accepted by modern scientists. He is today best remembered for his close friendship and theoretical collaboration with Sigmund Freud, a controversial chapter in the history of psychoanalysis.

== Career ==
Fliess developed several idiosyncratic theories, such as "vital periodicity", forerunner of the popular concepts of biorhythms. His work never found scientific favour, but some of his thinking, such as the idea of innate bisexuality, was incorporated into Freud's theories. Fliess believed men and women went through mathematically-fixed sexual cycles of 23 and 28 days, respectively.

Another of Fliess's ideas was the theory of "nasal reflex neurosis". This became widely known following the publication of his controversial book Neue Beitrage und Therapie der nasalen Reflexneurose in Vienna in 1892. The theory postulated a connection between the nose and the genitals and related this to a variety of neurological and psychological symptoms; Fliess devised a surgical operation intended to sever that link.

On Josef Breuer's suggestion, Fliess attended several conferences with Sigmund Freud beginning in 1887 in Vienna, and the two soon formed a strong friendship. Through their extensive correspondence and the series of personal meetings, Fliess came to play an important part in the development of psychoanalysis.

Freud, who described Fliess as "the Kepler of biology", repeatedly allowed Fliess to operate on his nose and sinuses to cure his neurosis and also experimented with anaesthetization of the nasal mucosa with cocaine. Together, Fliess and Freud developed a Project for a Scientific Psychology, which was later abandoned. Fliess wrote about his biorythmic theories in Der Ablauf des Lebens.

Emma Eckstein (1865–1924) had a particularly disastrous experience when Freud referred the then 27-year-old patient to Fliess for surgery to remove the turbinate bone from her nose, ostensibly to cure her of premenstrual depression. Eckstein haemorrhaged profusely in the weeks following the procedure, almost to the point of death as infection set in. Freud consulted with another surgeon, who removed a piece of surgical gauze that Fliess had left behind. Eckstein was left permanently disfigured, with the left side of her face caved in. Despite this, she remained on very good terms with Freud for many years, becoming a psychoanalyst herself.

Fliess also remained close friends with Freud. He even predicted Freud's death would be around the age of 51, through one of his complicated bio-numerological theories ("critical period calculations"). Their friendship, however, did not last to see that prediction out: in 1904 their friendship disintegrated due to Fliess's belief that Freud had given details about the bisexuality theory Fliess was developing to Otto Weininger for his book Sex and Character. Freud died at 83 years of age.

Freud ordered that his correspondence with Fliess be destroyed. It is known today only because Marie Bonaparte purchased Freud's letters to Fliess and refused to permit their destruction.

== Personal life ==
Fliess was born in Arnswalde, Province of Brandenburg, Kingdom of Prussia (today in Poland) on 24 October 1858.

His son Robert Fliess was a psychoanalyst and a prolific writer in that field. He devised the phrase ambulatory psychosis. Jeffrey Masson claimed that Fliess sexually molested his son Robert and that this caused Fliess to undermine Freud's investigation of the seduction theory because of its implications for his life.

His niece Beate Hermelin (née Fliess, 1919–2007), was an experimental psychologist who worked in the UK, where she made major contributions in what is now known as developmental cognitive neuroscience. Jointly with Neil O'Connor she started an important series of experiments to elucidate childhood autism

== Legacy ==
Medical science has given a highly negative verdict to Fliess's theories. The nasogenital theory was briefly quite popular in late 19th century medical circles, but within a decade disappeared from the medical literature. Most scientists who have studied the question believe that the biorhythms theory has no more predictive power than chance and consider the concept an example of pseudoscience.

According to Frank Sulloway, most of Freud's sympathetic biographers have attributed Freud's adherence to Fliess's pseudoscience to their strong friendship. Going one step further, Joel Whitebook has posited their relationship as having been one of infatuation and passionate, irrational love; an amour fou which served as material for Freud's later accomplishments. Martin Gardner suggested that Freud's willingness to entertain Fliess's "crackpottery" casts doubt on psychoanalysis itself, and Gardner has condemned what he viewed as orthodox Freudians' attempts to hush up an embarrassment in the history of the movement.

Fliess appears as a character in Joseph Skibell's 2010 novel A Curable Romantic and in Sebastian Faulks's 2005 novel Human Traces. The story of the relationship between Freud and Fliess is told by Martin Gardner in his July 1966 Mathematical Games column in Scientific American.

== Bibliography ==
- Wilhelm Fließ (2007). Die Beziehungen zwischen Nase und weiblichen Geschlechtsorganen (in ihrer biologischen Bedeutung dargestellt) (in German). Saarbrücken: VDM Verlag Dr. Müller.
- Sigmund Freud: Briefe an Wilhelm Fließ 1887–1904. S. Fischer Verlag, 2. Auflage (incl. Errata und Addenda) 1999.
- With Sigmund Freud: The Complete Letters of Sigmund Freud to Wilhelm Fliess, 1887–1904. Belknap Press. 1986. ISBN 0-674-15421-5. Translated and edited by Jeffrey Moussaieff Masson.
- Ernest Jones:
  - — (1953). Sigmund Freud: Life and Work. Vol 1: The Young Freud 1856–1900.
  - — (1955). Sigmund Freud: Life and Work. Vol 2: The Years of Maturity 1901–1919.
  - — (1957). Sigmund Freud: Life and Work. Vol 3: The Last Phase 1919–1939. London: Hogarth Press.
