= Biorhythm (pseudoscience) =

Dubious idea about physiological cycles

Basic rhythm details
- Physical cycle: 23 days – Circavigintan; coordination; strength; well-being
- Emotional cycle: 28 days – Circatrigintan; creativity; sensitivity; mood; perception; awareness
- Intellectual cycle: 33 days – Circatrigintan; alertness; analytical functioning; logical analysis; memory or recall; communication

The biorhythm chart when a person was born

Biorhythm chart over the first 66-day period after birth: Physical Emotional Intellectual

The biorhythm theory is the pseudoscientific idea that peoples' daily lives are significantly affected by rhythmic cycles with periods of exactly 23, 28 and 33 days, typically a 23-day physical cycle, a 28-day emotional cycle, and a 33-day intellectual cycle. The idea was developed by German otolaryngologist Wilhelm Fliess in the late 19th century, and was popularized in the United States in the late 1970s. The proposal has been independently tested and, consistently, no validity for it has been found.

According to the notion of biorhythms, a person's life is influenced by rhythmic biological cycles that affect their ability in various domains, such as mental, physical, and emotional activity. These cycles begin at birth and oscillate in a steady (sine wave) fashion throughout life, and by modeling them mathematically, it is suggested that a person's level of ability in each of these domains can be predicted from day to day. It is built on the idea that the biofeedback chemical and hormonal secretion functions within the body could show a sinusoidal behavior over time.

Most biorhythm models use three cycles: a 23-day physical cycle, a 28-day emotional cycle, and a 33-day intellectual cycle. These cycles are to be adjusted based on the person's personal day clock which may run from 22 hours to 27 hours although 23-25 is the norm. Two ways one can find their personal day clock is to test one's grip and body temperature every 15 minutes for a few days or the same time each day for a few months. Although the 28-day cycle is the same length as the average woman's menstrual cycle and was originally described as a "female" cycle (see below), the two are not necessarily in synchronization. Each of these cycles varies between high and low extremes sinusoidally, with days where the cycle crosses the zero line described as "critical days" of greater risk or uncertainty.

The numbers from +100% (maximum) to -100% (minimum) indicate where on each cycle the rhythms are on a particular day. In general, a rhythm at 0% is crossing the midpoint and is thought to have no real impact on one's life, whereas a rhythm at +100% (at the peak of that cycle) would give one an edge in that area, and a rhythm at -100% (at the bottom of that cycle) would make life more difficult in that area. There is no particular meaning to a day on which one's rhythms are all high or all low, except the obvious benefits or hindrances that these rare extremes are thought to have on one's life.

In addition to the three popular cycles, various other cycles have been proposed, based on linear combination of the three, or on longer or shorter rhythms.

== Calculation ==
Theories published state the equations for the cycles as:

- physical: $\sin(2\pi t/23)$,
- emotional: $\sin(2\pi t/28)$,
- intellectual: $\sin(2\pi t/33)$,

where $t$ indicates the number of days since birth. Basic arithmetic shows that the combination of the simpler 23- and 28-day cycles repeats every 644 days (or 1 3/4 years), while the triple combination of 23-, 28-, and 33-day cycles repeats every 21,252 days (or 58.18+ years).

== History ==
The 23- and 28-day rhythms used by biorhythmists were first devised in the late 19th century by Wilhelm Fliess, a Berlin physician and friend of Sigmund Freud. Fliess believed that he observed regularities at 23- and 28-day intervals in a number of phenomena, including births and deaths. He labeled the 23-day rhythm "male" and the 28-day rhythm "female", matching the menstrual cycle.

In 1904, Viennese psychology professor Hermann Swoboda came to similar conclusions. Alfred Teltscher, professor of engineering at the University of Innsbruck, developed Swoboda's work and suggested that his students' good and bad days followed a rhythmic pattern; he believed that the brain's ability to absorb, mental ability, and alertness ran in 33-day cycles. One of the first academic researchers of biorhythms was Estonian-born Nikolai Pärna, who published a book in German called Rhythm, Life and Creation in 1923.

The practice of consulting biorhythms was popularized in the 1970s by a series of books by Bernard Gittelson, including Biorhythm—A Personal Science, Biorhythm Charts of the Famous and Infamous, and Biorhythm Sports Forecasting. Gittelson's company, Biorhythm Computers, Inc., made a business selling personal biorhythm charts and calculators, but his ability to predict sporting events was not substantiated.

Charting biorhythms for personal use was popular in the United States during the 1970s; many places (especially video arcades and amusement areas) had a biorhythm machine that provided charts upon entry of date of birth. Biorhythm programs were a common application on personal computers; and in the late 1970s, there were also handheld biorhythm calculators on the market, the Kosmos 1 and the Casio Biolator.

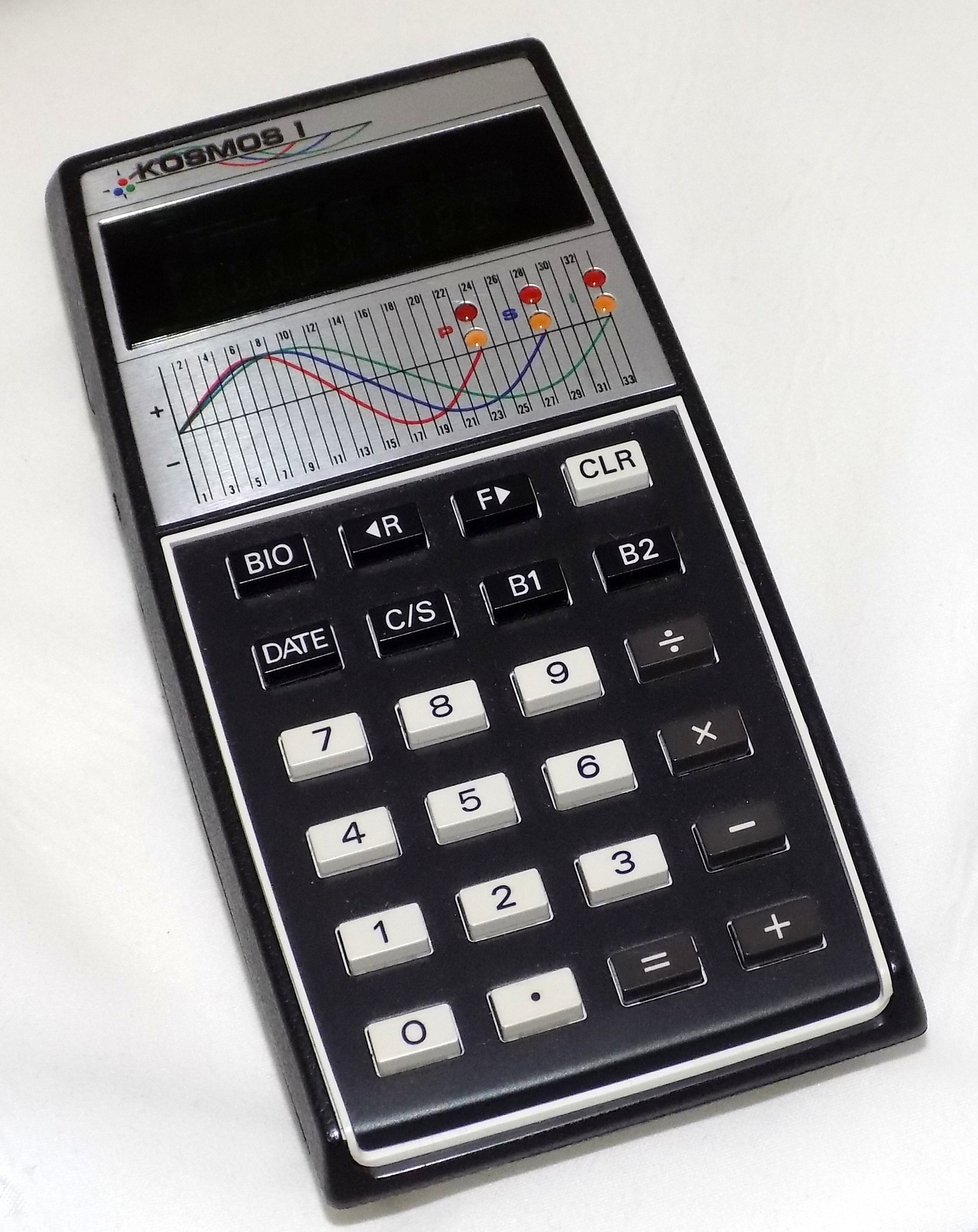
Kosmos 1

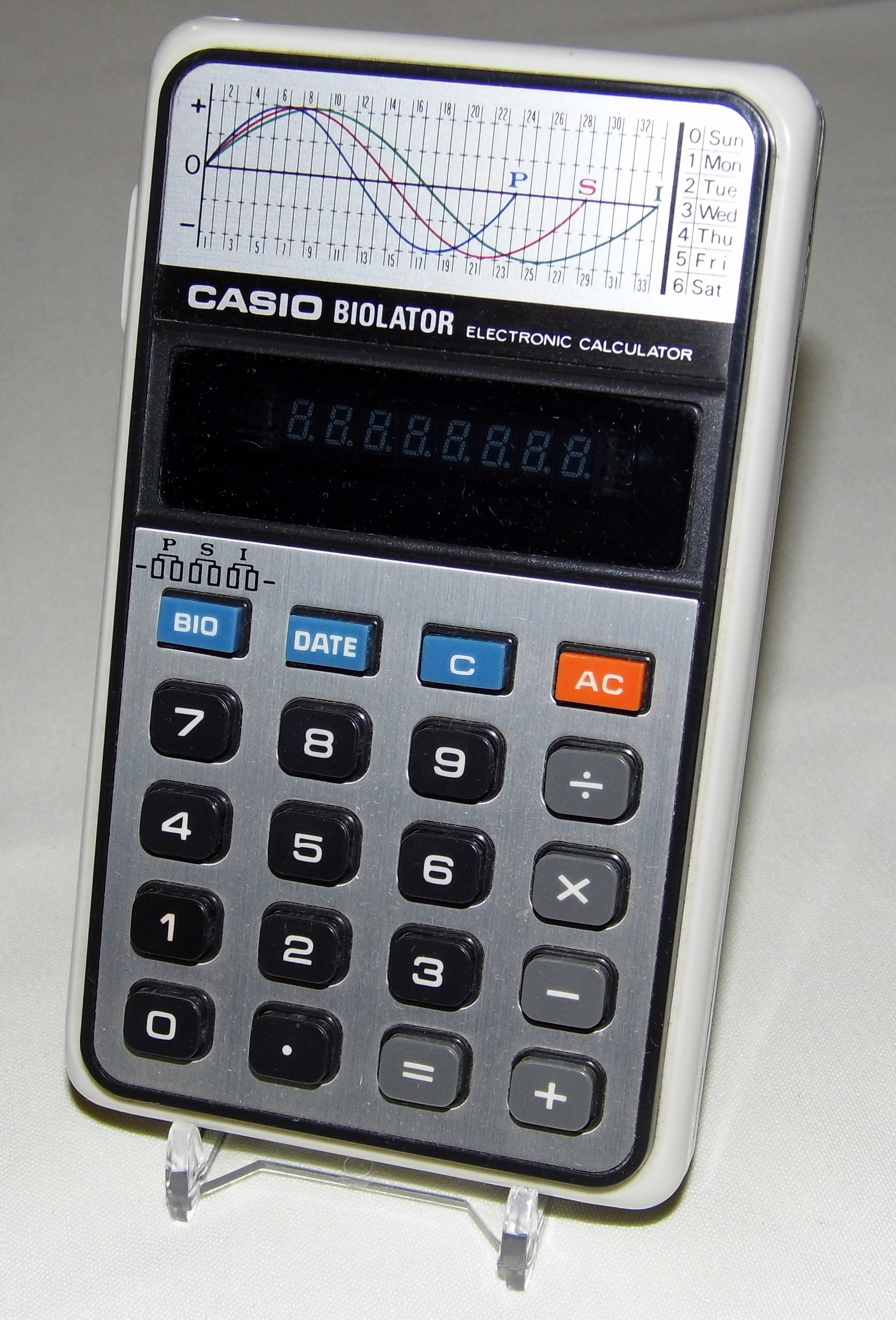
Casio Biolator

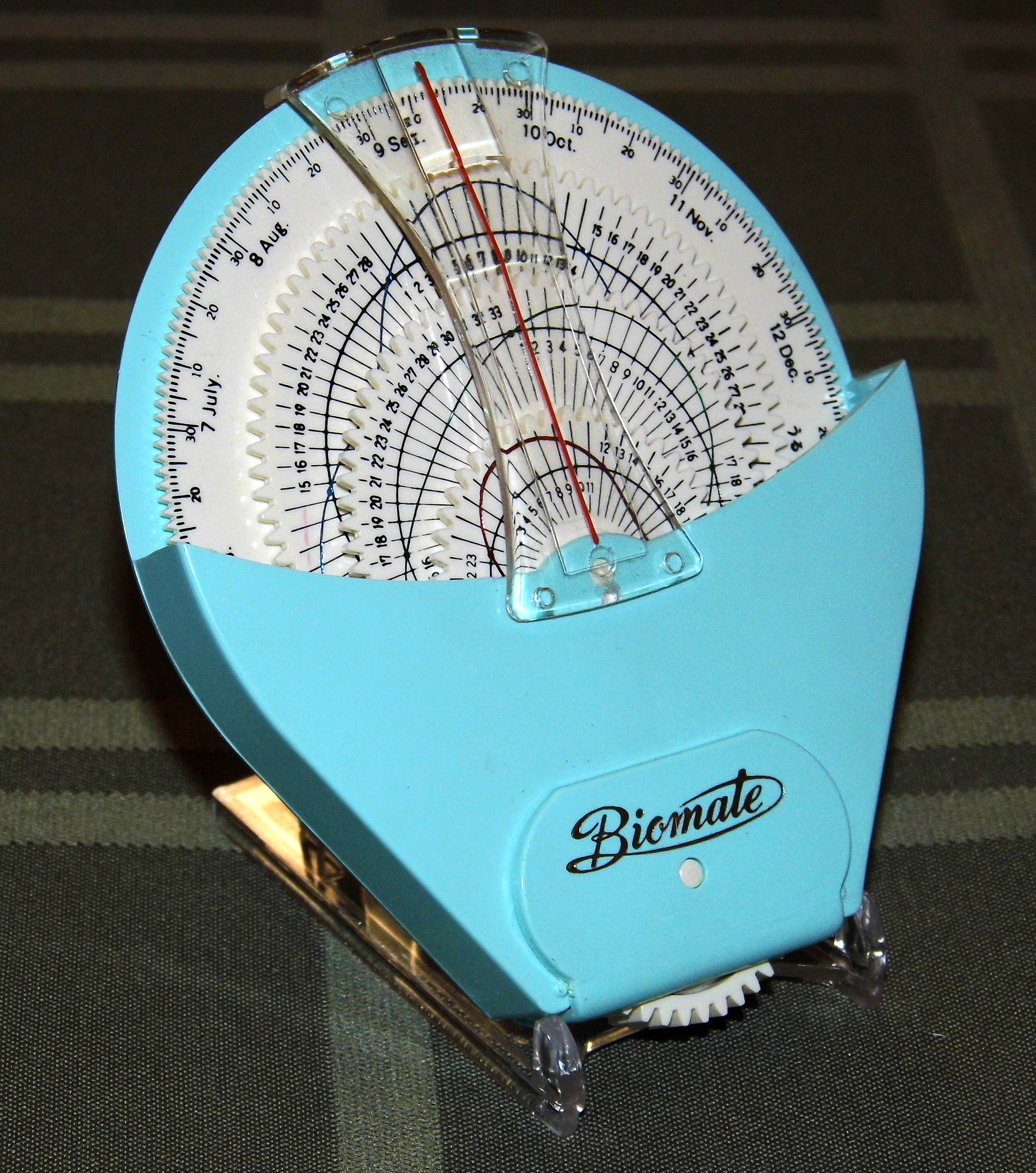
Japanese Biomate biorhythm calculator

== Critical views ==
There have been some three dozen published studies of biorhythm theory, but according to a study by Terence Hines, all of those either supported the null hypothesis that there is no correlation of human experience and the supposed biorhythms beyond what can be explained by coincidence, or, in cases where authors claimed to have evidence for biorhythm theory, methodological and statistical errors invalidated their conclusions. Hines therefore concluded that the theory is not valid.

Supporters continued to defend the theory in spite of the lack of corroborating scientific evidence, leading to the charge that it had become a kind of pseudoscience due to its proponents' rejection of empirical testing:

An examination of some 134 biorhythm studies found that the theory is not valid (Hines, 1998). It is empirically testable and has been shown to be false. Terence Hines believes that this fact implies that biorhythm theory 'can not be properly termed a pseudoscientific theory'. However, when the advocates of an empirically testable theory refuse to give up the theory in the face of overwhelming evidence against it, it seems reasonable to call the theory pseudoscientific. For, in fact, the adherents to such a theory have declared by their behaviour that there is nothing that could falsify it, yet they continue to claim the theory is scientific. (from Carroll's The Skeptic's Dictionary)

The physiologist Gordon Stein in the book Encyclopedia of Hoaxes (1993) wrote:

Both the theoretical underpinning and the practical scientific verification of biorhythm theory are lacking. Without those, biorhythms became just another pseudoscientific claim that people are willing to accept without required evidence. Those pushing biorhythm calculators and books on a gullible public are guilty of making fraudulent claims. They are hoaxers of the public if they know what they are saying has no factual justification.

A 1978 study of the incidence of industrial accidents found neither empirical nor theoretical support for the biorhythm model.

In Underwood Dudley's book, Numerology: Or What Pythagoras Wrought, he provides an example of a situation in which a magician provides a woman her biorhythm chart that supposedly included the next two years of her life. The women sent letters to the magician describing how accurate the chart was. The magician purposely sent her a biorhythm chart based on a different birthdate. After he explained that he sent the wrong chart to her, he sent her another chart, also having the wrong birthdate. She then said that this new chart was even more accurate than the previous one. This kind of willful credulous belief in vague or inaccurate prognostication derives from motivated reasoning backed up by fallacious acceptance of confirmation bias, post hoc rationalization, and suggestibility.

Wilhelm Fliess "was able to impose his number patterns on virtually everything" and worked to convince others that cycles happen within men and women every 23 and 28 days. Mathematically, Fliess's equation, n = 23x +28y is unconstrained as there are infinitely many solutions for x and y, meaning that Fliess and Sigmund Freud (who adopted this idea in the early 1890s) could predict anything they wanted with the combination.

The skeptical evaluations of the various biorhythm proposals led to a number of critiques lambasting the subject published in the 1970s and 1980s. Biorhythm advocates who objected to the takedowns claimed that because circadian rhythms had been empirically verified in many organisms' sleep cycles, biorhythms were just as plausible. However, unlike biorhythms, which are claimed to have precise and unaltering periods, circadian rhythms are found by observing the cycle itself and the periods are found to vary in length based on biological and environmental factors. Assuming such factors were relevant to biorhythms would result in chaotic cycle combinations that remove any "predictive" features.

=== Additional studies ===
Several controlled, experimental studies found no correlation between the 23, 28 and 33 day cycles and academic performance. These studies include:

==== James (1984) ====
James hypothesized that if biorhythms were rooted in science, then each proposed biorhythm cycle would contribute to task performance. Further, he predicted that each type of biorhythm cycle (i.e., intellectual, physical, and emotional) would be most influential on tasks associated with the corresponding cycle type. For example, he postulated that intellectual biorhythm cycles would be most influential on academic testing performance. In order to test his hypotheses, James observed 368 participants, noting their performance on tasks associated with intellectual, physical, and emotional functioning. Based on data collected from his research, James concluded that there was no relation between subjects' biorhythmic status (on any of the three cycle types), and their performance on the associated practical tests.

==== Peveto (1980) ====
Peveto examined the proposed relationship between biorhythms and academic performance, specifically in terms of reading ability. Through examination of the data collected, Peveto concluded that there were no significant differences in the academic performance of the students, in regards to reading, during the high, low, or critical positions of neither the physical biorhythm cycle, the emotional biorhythm cycle, nor the intellectual biorhythm cycle. As a result, it was concluded that biorhythm cycles have no effect on the academic performance of students, when academic performance was measured using reading ability.

== See also ==
- Biological rhythm
- Blood type personality theory
- Chronotherapy (treatment scheduling)
- Circadian rhythm
- Mood ring
