= Robert Fliess =

German-American psychoanalyst (1895–1970)

- Born: Wilhelm Robert Fließ; 29 December 1895; Berlin, German Empire
- Died: 9 May 1970 (aged 74); Little Compton, Rhode Island, U.S.
- Occupation: Psychoanalyst

Wilhelm Robert Fliess (German: Fließ [fliːs]; 29 December 1895 – 9 May 1970) was a German-American physician and psychoanalyst. He was the son of Wilhelm Fliess, a controversial otolaryngologist whose pseudoscientific theories influenced Sigmund Freud. He coined the term ambulatory psychosis. He wrote about sexual abuse and hinted that his father had abused him.

He immigrated to the United States in 1933 and worked as a physician. His cousin Beate Hermelin was a German-born experimental psychologist, who worked in the UK.

He died of liver cancer in 1970.

== Select bibliography ==
- Psychoanalytic Series, Volume 1: Erogeneity and Libido : Addenda to the Theory of the Psychosexual Development of the Human
- Psychoanalytic Series, Volume 2: Ego and Body Ego: Contributions to Their Psychoanalytic Psychology
- Psychoanalytic Series, Volume 3: Symbol, Dream and Psychosis
