= List of honorary fellows of Newnham College, Cambridge =

This is a list of Honorary Fellows of Newnham College, Cambridge. A list of current honorary fellows is published on the college's website at Honorary Fellows List of Honorary Fellows.

- Marin Alsop
- Joan Armatrading
- Jenn Ashworth
- Joan Bakewell, Baroness Bakewell
- Clare Balding
- Dame Carol Black
- Dame Mary Beard
- Betty Boothroyd, Baroness Boothroyd
- Jane Brown
- Sharan Burrow
- Dame Antonia Byatt
- Anne Campbell
- Jean Coussins, Baroness Coussins
- P. E. Easterling
- Sylvia Frey
- Dame Uta Frith
- Rosalind Gilmore
- Dame Jane Goodall
- Helene Hayman, Baroness Hayman
- Dame Patricia Hewitt
- Dame Patricia Hodgson
- Brigid Hogan
- Ann Mallalieu, Baroness Mallalieu
- Brenda Milner
- Julia Neuberger, Baroness Neuberger
- Jessye Norman
- Mary Beth Norton
- Onora O'Neill, Baroness O'Neill of Bengarve
- Dame Sue Owen
- Dame Fiona Reynolds
- Joyce Reynolds
- Dame Alison Richard
- Vivien Rose, Lady Rose of Colmworth
- Pat Simpson
- Hayat Sindi
- Ali Smith
- Elizabeth A. Thompson
- Dame Emma Thompson
- Janet Todd
- Sandi Toksvig
- Claire Tomalin
- Dame Margaret Weston
- Shirley Williams, Baroness Williams of Crosby
- Rosie Young
- Froma Zeitlin
