= Uta Frith =

German developmental psychologist (born 1941)

Dame Uta Frith DBE FRS FBA FMedSci
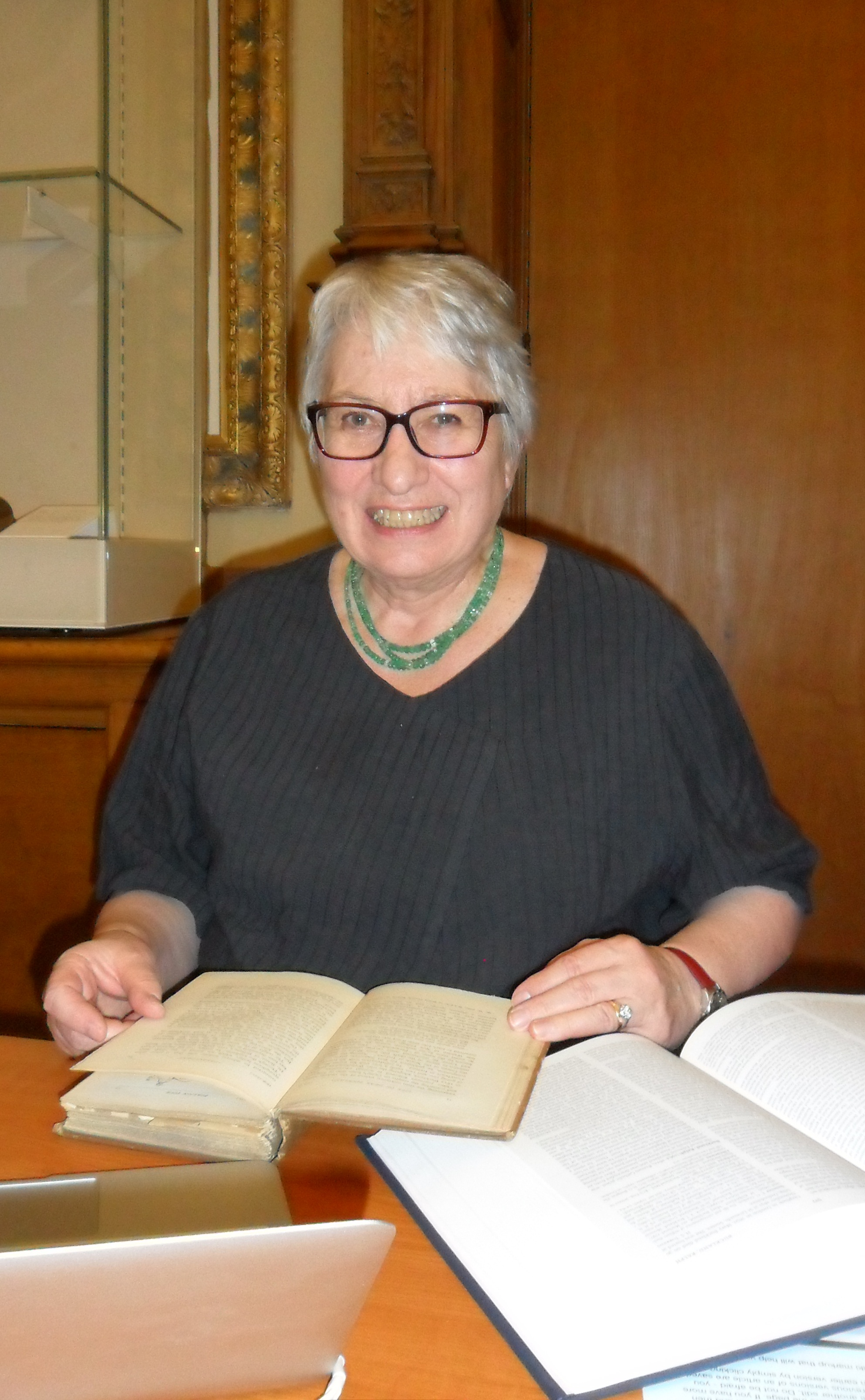
- Frith at the Royal Society, 2012
- Born: Uta Aurnhammer; 25 May 1941 (age 85); Rockenhausen, Rheinland-Pfalz, Germany
- Citizenship: Germany; United Kingdom (since 2019)
- Spouse: Chris Frith (m. 1966)
- Children: 2
- Awards: European Latsis Prize (2009); Mind & Brain Prize (2010); William James Fellow Award (2013); Jean Nicod Prize (2014)

Academic background
- Education: Saarland University; University of London (Institute of Psychiatry)
- Thesis: Pattern Detection in Normal and Autistic Children (1968)
- Doctoral advisor: Neil O'Connor
- Other advisor: Beate Hermelin

Academic work
- Discipline: Psychologist
- Institutions: University College London (Institute of Cognitive Neuroscience)
- Notable students: Simon Baron-Cohen; Francesca Happé; Ami Klin; Maggie Snowling
- Main interests: Autism; Dyslexia
- Uta Frith's voice from the BBC programme The Life Scientific, 6 December 2011.
- Website: Official website

Dame Uta Frith (née Aurnhammer; born 25 May 1941) is a German-British developmental psychologist and emeritus professor in cognitive development at the Institute of Cognitive Neuroscience at University College London (UCL). She pioneered much of the current research into autism and dyslexia. Her book Autism: Explaining the Enigma introduced the cognitive neuroscience of autism. She is credited with creating the Sally–Anne test along with fellow scientists Alan Leslie and Simon Baron-Cohen. Among students she has mentored are Tony Attwood, Maggie Snowling, Simon Baron-Cohen and Francesca Happé.

== Early life and education ==
Uta Aurnhammer was born in Rockenhausen, a small town in the hills between Luxembourg and Mannheim in Germany. She attended Saarland University in Saarbrücken with her initial plan for her education being in art history, but changed to experimental psychology after learning of its empirical nature. She was inspired by the work of psychologist Hans Eysenck and decided to train in clinical psychology at the Institute of Psychiatry in London. While at the institute, she was taught by Jack Rachman, one of the pioneers of behaviour therapy. She went on to complete her Doctor of Philosophy, on pattern detection in autistic children, in 1968.

Frith was mentored, during her early career, by Neil O'Connor and Beate Hermelin and has described them as pioneers in the field of autism.

== Research ==
Frith's research paved the way for the recognition of a theory of mind deficit in autism. In 1985, while she was a member of the Medical Research Council's Cognitive Development Unit (MRC-CDU) in London, she published with Alan M. Leslie and Simon Baron-Cohen the article "Does the autistic child have a 'theory of mind'?", which proposed that autistic people have specific difficulties understanding other people's beliefs and desires. This paper used a false-belief task invented by Joseph Perner in 1983. Frith, and her colleagues, created two theories of autism. The first is "lack of implicit mentalizing", a lack of the ability to track others' mental state with a basis in the brain. The second is "weak central coherence" by which she suggested that autistic individuals are better than neurotypical people at processing details, but worse at integrating information from many different sources. Frith has published research suggesting autistics have impaired self- consciousness. Frith was one of the first neuroscientists to recognize autism "as a condition of the brain rather than the result of cold parenting." Frith used metaphors comparing autistic speech and behaviour to Robots in her book Autism: explaining the enigma.

She was one of the first people in the UK to study Asperger syndrome, at MRC-CDU London. Her work also focused on reading development, spelling and dyslexia. Frith attacked the theory that dyslexia was linked to lack of intelligence or caused by sensorimotor impairments. In her book on spelling, she pointed out that some people can be perfectly competent readers, but extremely poor spellers, a group of dyslexics not recognised before. Her research, along with that of Maggie Snowling, showed that people with dyslexia tend to struggle with phonological processing. In 1995 Frith, Paulesu, Snowling and colleagues conducted one of the first brain imaging studies with dyslexic adults showing that, while completing tasks requiring phonological processing, people with dyslexia show a lack of functional connectivity within the language network of the brain.

Frith has been supported throughout her career by the Medical Research Council at University College London. She was an active collaborator at the Interacting Minds Centre at Aarhus University in Denmark. The goal of the centre is to provide a trans-disciplinary platform, upon which the many aspects of human interaction may be studied. The project is based in part on a paper written with Chris Frith: "Interacting Minds – a Biological Basis".

Among students she has mentored are Tony Attwood, Maggie Snowling, Simon Baron-Cohen and Francesca Happé.

== Supporting women in science ==
Frith has encouraged the advancement of women in science, in part by developing a support network called Science & Shopping, which she hopes will "encourage women to share ideas and information that are inspiring and fun." She also co-founded the UCL Women network, "a grassroots networking and social organization for academic staff (postdocs and above) in STEM at UCL", in January 2013. In 2015 she was named chair of the Royal Society's Diversity Committee, during which time she wrote about unconscious bias and how it affects which scientists receive grants.

== In the media ==
On 11 May 2012 Frith appeared as a guest on the American PBS Charlie Rose television interview show. On 4 December she appeared as a guest on the "Brain" episode of BBC Two's Dara Ó Briain's Science Club.

On 1 March 2013, she was the guest on BBC Radio 4's Desert Island Discs. In 2013 Frith wrote on the visibility of women in science, by promoting an exhibition on female scientist portraits at The Royal Society.

From 31 March to 4 April 2014, to coincide with World Autism Awareness Day on 2 April, she was the guest of Sarah Walker on BBC Radio 3's Essential Classics. On 1 April 2014, she featured in "Living with Autism", an episode of the BBC Horizon documentary series. On 26 August 2015, she presented the Horizon episode entitled "OCD: A Monster in my Mind". On 29 August 2017, she presented the Horizon episode entitled "What Makes a Psychopath?".

On 13 December 2017, she gave an interview to the Association for Child and Adolescent Mental Health, in which she talked about her early life and her passion for autism research in children.

On 4 March 2026, in an interview with Tes magazine, Frith stated that she believes that the autism spectrum has widened to the "point of its collapse". Her comments were met with criticism by some in the autistic community and researchers, including her former student Simon Baron-Cohen.

== Fellowships and awards ==
Frith was elected a Fellow of the British Academy in 2001, a Fellow of the Academy of Medical Sciences in 2001, a Fellow of the Royal Society in 2005, an Honorary Fellow of the British Psychological Society in 2006, an Honorary Fellow of University College London in 2007, a member of the German Academy of Sciences Leopoldina in 2008, an Honorary Fellow of Newnham College, Cambridge in 2008, a Foreign Associate of the National Academy of Sciences in 2012, and a member of the European Molecular Biology Organisation in 2014. She was President of the Experimental Psychology Society in 2006 and 2007. Frith also received an honorary doctorate from the University of Bath.

In 2009, Frith and her husband, Chris, jointly received the European Latsis Prize for their contribution to understanding the human mind and brain, and in 2010 she was awarded the Mind & Brain Prize. She received a William James Fellow Award in 2013. In 2014, she and her husband won the Jean Nicod Prize, for their work on social cognition.

In 2012, Frith became an Honorary Dame Commander of the Order of the British Empire (DBE), which was made substantive on 4 April 2019 after the German Government permitted dual British/German nationality. This allowed her to be called Dame Uta. In 2015, she was listed as one of BBC's 100 Women.

== Personal life ==
Frith married fellow British neuroscientist Chris Frith in 1966. In 2008 a double portrait was painted by Emma Wesley. They have two sons. Working with their son Alex Frith and illustrator Daniel Locke, Frith and her husband produced the graphic novel Two Heads: Where Two Neuroscientists Explore How Our Brains Work with Other Brains in 2022. This combined an introduction to neuroscience and social cognition, with their own personal and professional experiences throughout their careers.
