= Joel Whitebook =

American Philosopher and Psychoanalyst

- Born: 1947 (age 78–79); Los Angeles, California, U.S.

Academic background
- Education: The New School For Social Research (PhD); City University of New York (PhD)
- Theses: Economics and Ethical Life: A Study of Aristotle and Hegel (1978); Perversions and Utopia: A Study in Psychoanalysis and Social Theory (1984)
- Doctoral advisor: Albert Hofstadter, Reiner Schürmann, Stewart Umphrey
- Other advisors: Hannah Arendt, Hans Jonas, Albrecht Wellmer

Academic work
- Era: Contemporary philosophy
- Discipline: Social theory, psychoanalysis
- Region: Western philosophy
- School or tradition: Frankfurt School
- Institutions: Columbia University
- Website: joel-whitebook.com

Joel Whitebook (born 1947) is an American philosopher, psychoanalyst and author.

== Life and works ==
Raised in a secular, liberal Jewish family, Whitebook studied philosophy at the University of California, Berkeley, in the late 1960s. There, his involvement with the New Left and exposure to the Frankfurt School—especially through Herbert Marcuse—shifted his interests away from analytic philosophy toward more socially and psychologically engaged approaches.

Seeking a broader framework, Whitebook pursued doctoral studies in philosophy at The New School for Social Research, studying with Hannah Arendt, Hans Jonas, and Albrecht Wellmer, a second-generation Frankfurt School thinker. His work with Wellmer deepened his commitment to integrating psychoanalysis with Critical Theory—a project that has defined his career.

After earning his Ph.D. in 1977, Whitebook trained as a psychoanalyst, completing a second doctorate in clinical psychology at City University of New York and his analytic training at The New York Freudian Society. He began practicing in 1985 and went on to combine private practice with teaching at The New School, Columbia University, and several clinical institutions. He is now on the faculty of Columbia’s Center for Psychoanalytic Training and Research and formerly directed its Psychoanalytic Studies Program.

Whitebook’s scholarship, including his book Perversion and Utopia and numerous essays, continues the Frankfurt School’s project of linking psychoanalysis and social theory. Drawing on thinkers like Hans Loewald and Cornelius Castoriadis, he explores post-Freudian “preoedipal” developments in psychoanalysis and their implications for Critical Theory. His more recent work, including his intellectual biography of Freud, uses these insights to address the theme of the “missing mother.”

Whitebook was a member of Slate magazine’s “Sopranos” discussion group, participating in weekly roundtables on Tony Soprano’s sessions with Dr. Melfi—an experience he counts among his favorite professional moments.

== Selected publications ==
- Whitebook, Joel (1996). Perversion and Utopia: A Study in Psychoanalysis and Critical Theory. MIT Press. ISBN 978-0-262-73117-1.
- Whitebook, Joel (2017). Freud: An Intellectual Biography. Cambridge University Press. ISBN 978-1-108-21008-9.
