= Autism: Explaining the Enigma =

1989 book by Uta Frith

- Author: Uta Frith
- Language: English
- Subject: Autism
- Genre: Science
- Publisher: Blackwell Publishing
- Publication date: 1989; 2003 (second edition)
- Publication place: United Kingdom
- Media type: Hardcover, Paperback
- ISBN: 0-631-22901-9
- OCLC: 50404148
- Dewey Decimal: 618.92/8982 21
- LC Class: RJ506.A9 F695 2003
- Followed by: Autism – Mind and Brain

Autism: Explaining the Enigma is a non-fiction book by developmental psychologist Uta Frith, first published by Basil Blackwell in 1989, that surveys research on autism through a cognitive and neuropsychological lens. A substantially updated second edition was published in 2003.

== Overview ==
In the book, Frith synthesises research on autism and discusses cognitive accounts that were influential in late-20th-century autism research, including difficulties in understanding other people's mental states (often discussed in relation to theory of mind) and atypical integration of information (commonly discussed under the term weak central coherence).

The second edition adds discussion of subsequent developments and includes expanded coverage of neuropsychological and neuroscience research that emerged after the first edition.

== See also ==
- Unstrange Minds
- Cognitive psychology
