= André Fliess =

German footballer (born 1992)

Personal information
- Date of birth: 19 January 1992 (age 34)
- Place of birth: Frankfurt, Germany
- Height: 1.75 m (5 ft 9 in)
- Position: Attacking midfielder

Team information
- Current team: FC Ober-Rosbach

Youth career
- –2011: Kickers Offenbach

Senior career*
Years	Team	Apps	(Gls)
2011–2012	Kickers Offenbach II	23	(7)
2011–2012	Kickers Offenbach	2	(0)
2012–2014	Eintracht Frankfurt II	53	(6)
2014	SVN Zweibrücken	3	(0)
2014–2015	FC Nöttingen	18	(1)
2015–2017	Rot-Weiss Frankfurt	57	(22)
2017–2019	Hessen Dreieich	33	(13)
2019	Eintracht Stadtallendorf	10	(1)
2019–2020	SG Barockstadt	18	(11)
2020–2022	FC Eddersheim	19	(7)
2022–2023	SF Friedrichsdorf	13	(5)
2023–	DJK Bad Homburg	16	(2)
- * Club domestic league appearances and goals as of 16:21, 13 February 2024 (UTC)

André Fliess (born 19 January 1992) is a German footballer who plays as an attacking midfielder for Verbandsliga Hessen-Süd club DJK Bad Homburg.

== Career ==
Fliess began his career with Kickers Offenbach, making his 3. Liga debut in August 2011, as a substitute for Sead Mehic in a 4–1 defeat to SpVgg Unterhaching. In July 2012, he signed for Eintracht Frankfurt II.
