= Sue Fliess =

American writer

- Born: Sue Douglass Fliess; Modesto, California, U.S.
- Occupations: Author, copywriter, freelancer
- Writing career
- Years active: 2003–present
- Notable awards: 2007 SCBWI Letter of Commendation for the Barbara Karlin Grant for Picture Book Writing; 2008 SCBWI Letter of Commendation for the Barbara Karlin Grant for Picture Book Writing
- Website: suefliess.com

Sue Fliess is an American author, copywriter and freelancer.

== Personal life ==
Fliess is married, has two children and a Labrador Retriever named Charlie. She lives with them in Northern Virginia.

== Bibliography ==
1. Shoes for Me! (March 1, 2011)
2. A Dress for Me! (March 20, 2012)
3. Tons of Trucks (July 3, 2012)
4. How to Be a Pirate (January 7, 2014)
5. Let's Build (May 6, 2014)
6. Robots, Robots Everywhere! (July 22, 2014)
7. How to Be a Superhero (July 22, 2014)
8. A Gluten-Free Birthday for Me! (August 15, 2014)
9. The Hug Book (December 23, 2014)
10. Books for Me! (January 13, 2015)
11. We're Getting A Pet! (July 14, 2015)
12. I'm A Ballerina! (July 14, 2015)
13. Bella's New Baby (January 12, 2016)
14. The Bug Book (February 23, 2016)
15. A Fairy Friend (May 10, 2016)

== Awards ==
- 2007 SCBWI Letter of Commendation for the Barbara Karlin Grant for Picture Book Writing
- 2008 SCBWI Letter of Commendation for the Barbara Karlin Grant for Picture Book Writing
