= Tony Attwood =

British psychologist (born 1952)

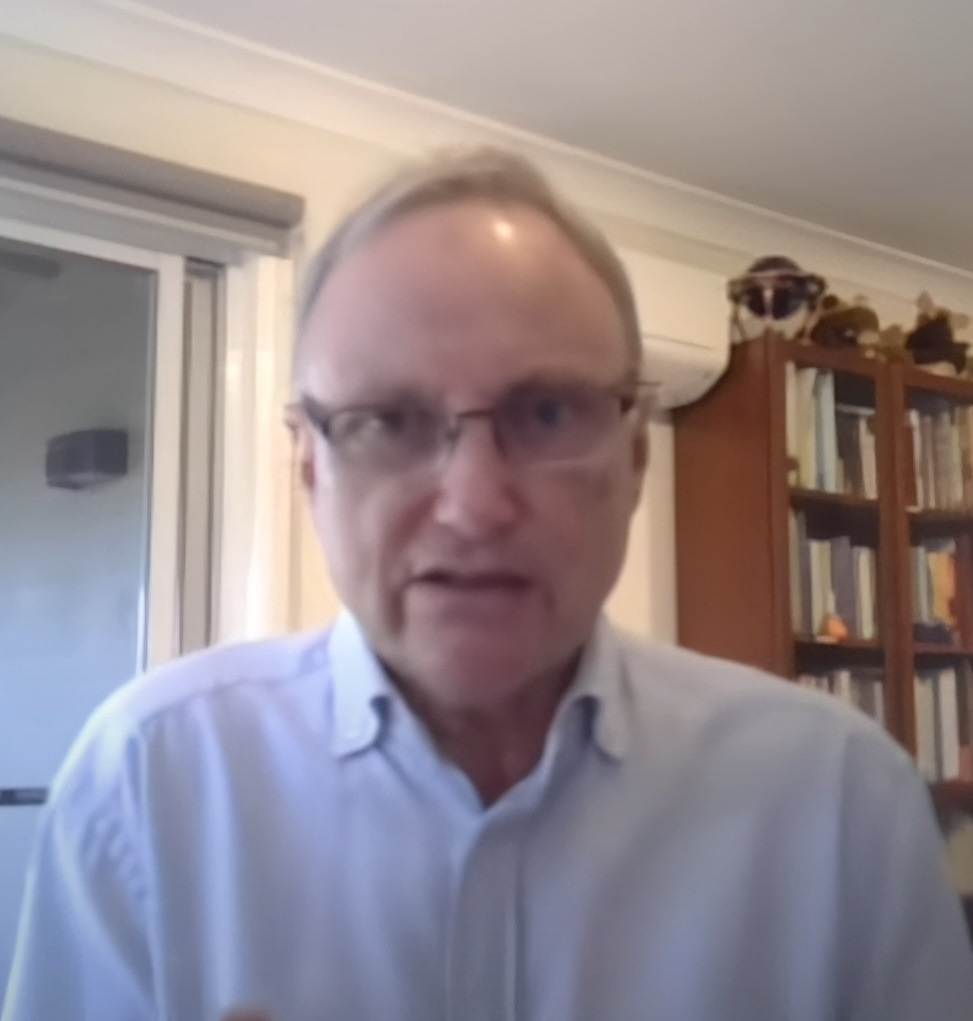
- Attwood in 2020
- Born: Anthony John Attwood; 9 February 1952 (age 74); Birmingham, England

Academic background
- Education: University of Hull (BA); University of Surrey (MA); University College London (PhD)
- Thesis: Gestures of Autistic Children (1983)
- Doctoral advisor: Uta Frith

Academic work
- Discipline: Psychologist
- Institutions: Griffith University
- Main interests: autism level 1
- Website: tonyattwood.com.au

Anthony John Attwood (born 9 February 1952) is a British psychologist notable for his work on autism level 1. He resides in Queensland, Australia, where he is an associate professor at Griffith University.

== Education ==
He received an honours degree in psychology from the University of Hull, an M.A. in clinical psychology from the University of Surrey and a Ph.D. from University College London supervised by Uta Frith.

== Research and career ==
His books include Asperger's Syndrome: A Guide for Parents and Professionals, which has been translated into 20 languages and provides information on diagnosis, problems of social relations, sensory issues, motor control and other typical issues which face people with Asperger's and their support networks. His other books include The Complete Guide to Aspergers Syndrome, Exploring Feelings for Young Children with High-Functioning Autism or Aspergers Disorder, and From Like to Love for Young People with Aspergers Syndrome (Autism Spectrum Disorder): Learning How to Express and Enjoy Affection with Family and Friends.

Attwood has a clinical practice at his diagnostic and treatment clinic for children and adults with Asperger's Syndrome, in Brisbane, begun in 1992.

It took Attwood thirty years to notice that his own son, Will Attwood, was autistic, when rewatching childhood videos of him. Will had become addicted to drugs as a teenager and young adult and was jailed several times. He later wrote a book on his experience, Asperger’s Syndrome and Jail.

After 50 years of working in the autism field, Attwood recognized his own autism and shared his reflections publicly in March of 2026.

== Publications ==
=== Books ===
- Attwood, Tony (2003). Why Does Chris Do That?. AAPC Publishing. ISBN 9781931282505.
- Attwood, Tony (1 January 1998). Asperger's syndrome. Jessica Kingsley Pub. ISBN 978-1-85302-577-8.
- Attwood, Tony (1 November 2006). The complete guide to Asperger's syndrome. Jessica Kingsley Pub. ISBN 978-1-84310-495-7.
- Attwood, Tony (15 September 2004). Asperger's Diagnostic Assessment. Future Horizons. ISBN 978-1-932565-17-1.
- Attwood, Tony (1 November 2004). Exploring Feelings: Cognitive Behaviour Therapy to Manage Anger. Future Horizons Inc. ISBN 978-1-932565-21-8.
- Attwood, Tony (1 November 2004). Exploring Feelings: Cognitive Behaviour Therapy to Manage Anxiety. Future Horizons Inc. ISBN 978-1-932565-22-5.
- Attwood, Tony (2013). From Like to Love for Young People with Aspergers Syndrome (Autism Spectrum Disorder): Learning How to Express and Enjoy Affection with Family and Friends. Jessica Kingsley Pub. ISBN 978-0-857007-77-3.
- Pike, Joanna; Attwood, Tony (18 July 2019). Neurodiverse Relationships: Autistic and Neurotypical Partners Share Their Experiences. London, UK. ISBN 978-1-78775-028-9. OCLC 1083182372.

=== DVD ===
- Attwood, Tony (1 November 2004). DVD: Exploring Feelings: Cognitive Behaviour Therapy to Manage Anxiety, Sadness, and Anger. Future Horizons Inc. ISBN 978-1-932565-61-4.

=== Selected papers ===
- Sofronoff, K; Attwood, T; Hinton, S; Levin, I (August 2007). "A randomized controlled trial of a cognitive behavioural intervention for anger management in children diagnosed with Asperger syndrome". J Autism Dev Disord. 37: 1203–14. doi:10.1007/s10803-006-0262-3. PMID 17082978.
- Sofronoff, K; Attwood, T; Hinton, S (November 2005). "A randomised controlled trial of a CBT intervention for anxiety in children with Asperger syndrome". J Child Psychol Psychiatry. 46 (11): 1152–60. doi:10.1111/j.1469-7610.2005.00411.x. PMID 16238662.
- Attwood, T (January 2003). "Frameworks for behavioral interventions". Child Adolesc Psychiatr Clin N Am. 12: 65–86, vi. PMID 12512399. (A review article)
