= Neil O'Connor =

British-Australian psychologist (1917–1997)

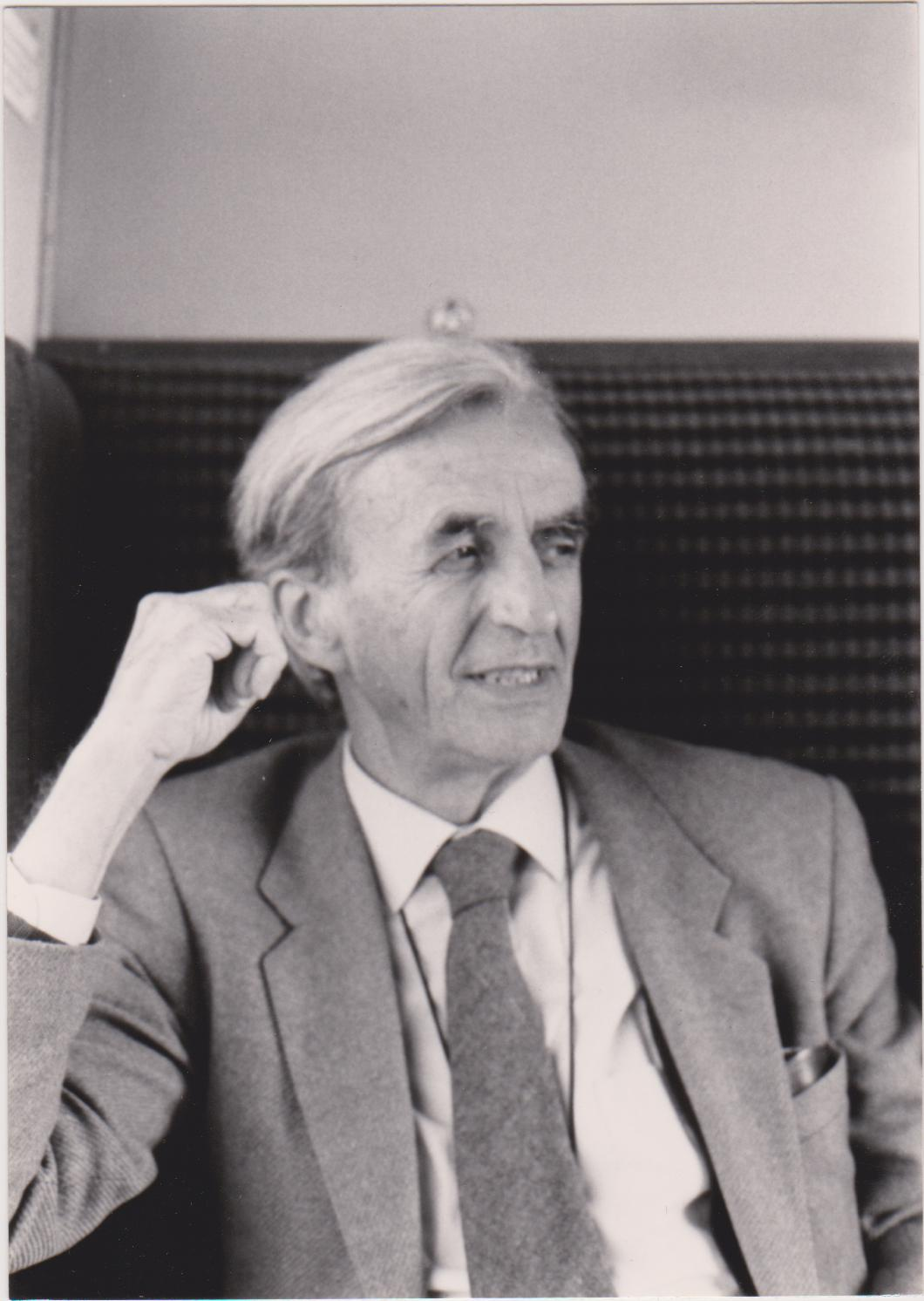
- Born: March 23, 1917; Geraldton, Western Australia
- Died: October 1, 1997 (aged 80)
- Education: University of Oxford; Institute of Psychiatry
- Scientific career
- Fields: experimental psychology
- Workplaces: University of London, University College London
- Thesis: Personality variables which affect the vocational and social efficiency of highgrade mental defectives (1951)
- Doctoral students: Uta Frith; John Sloboda

Neil O'Connor (March 23, 1917 – October 1, 1997) was an experimental psychologist, born in Geraldton, Western Australia. He died in 1997 after a traffic incident.

== Education ==
He studied Philosophy and Experimental Psychology in Oxford and served in India in the Second World War. He became interested in studying the extent to with learning disabled individuals could still learn when studying for a PhD at the Institute of Psychiatry (now part of King's College London). With Jack Tizard he conducted groundbreaking experiments that showed that these individuals could indeed learn and be employed. This work led to greater awareness of the barriers created by residential care.

== Career and research ==
Holding strong socialist principles Neil O'Connor forged academic connections with Soviet psychologists and neuropsychologists, for example, Alexander Luria. In this way, he helped spread their often advanced ideas on learning and attention in the education of children with mental deficiency among Western psychologists.

Until 1968 O'Connor was a member of the Medical Research Council (MRC) Social Psychiatry Unit at the Institute of Psychiatry (University of London). He received the Kennedy Prize for his work with Jack Tizard. In 1968 he became director of the MRC Developmental Psychology Unit, affiliated to University College London, from 1968 to 1982, when he retired. He believed in having a very small group of independent scientists. His own work was always in collaboration with Beate Hermelin, with strict rotation of authorship. They enjoyed working together and their different talents complemented each other perfectly.

Other members of this small MRC Unit (the MRC Cognitive Development Unit) were Uta Frith and Rick Cromer. Rick Cromer (born 1940 - died prematurely ca 1990) was a psycholinguist whose PhD thesis on early language acquisition had been supervised by Roger Brown, at Harvard. Rick brought expertise in the study of cognitive processes underlying language acquisition and language impairments. One of his best known paradigms was with puppets using the phrases: 'The duck is easy to bite; the wolf is eager to bite. Who does the biting?' The intriguing question is how do children understand the contrast in meaning that is not apparent in the surface of the syntactic form. Students of Neil O'Connor include Kim Kirsner, John Sloboda, Barbara Dodd and Linda Pring.

O'Connor was President of the Experimental Psychology Society. He shunned publicity and kept a 'low profile', in line with the ethos of the time, but was hugely admired by his colleagues and students. After retiring in 1982, Neil O'Connor continued to work with Beate Hermelin on special talent (Savants), an area where they pioneered experimental research. After O'Connor's death in a traffic accident in 1997 Beate Hermelin told the story of their joint work on this topic.

== Research ==
O'Connor was a pioneer in the experimental study of cognitive abilities in children with learning disabilities, various referred to as intellectual disability or subnormality. He applied the advances in psychology that originated from information processing. He studied processes underlying perception, memory, language and spatial abilities with refined behavioural methods and derived new knowledge from comparing individuals with different levels of general intellectual ability. His aim was to see whether there were specific deficits over and above general deficits. He therefore compared different groups of participants with known specific deficits, such as visual or auditory impairments to investigate the impact of such impairments, if any, on general abilities. He recognised that the study of special talents was another route to elucidate the architecture of the mind. He considered it likely that there were specific modules in the mind that could be differentially affected by brain pathology. O'Connor was the author of a large number of scientific articles between 1950 and 1994. The major experiments were summarized in several monographs.
