= Beate Hermelin =

German-born experimental psychologist

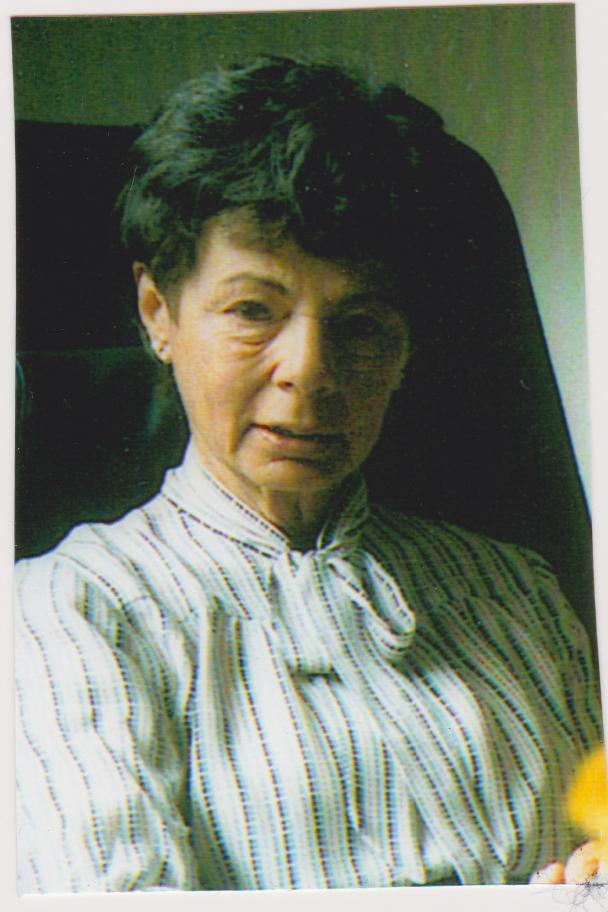
Beate Hermelin ca.1982

Beate Marianne E Hermelin, (née Fliess; 7 August 1919 – 14 January 2007), affectionately known as Ati, was a German-born experimental psychologist, who worked in the UK and was a pioneer in the experimental study of autism. Her numerous scientific publications span five decades.

== Early life ==
Hermelin was born into a well-to-do Jewish family in Berlin. Her father, who served as an officer in the First World War, was a lawyer. He was related to Wilhelm Fliess, a controversial otolaryngologist whose pseudoscientific theories influenced Sigmund Freud. Her mother Hilde was a High School teacher, born in Breslau. Beate's sister de:Dorothee Fliess was the only member of the family who stayed in Berlin during the Second World War.

In 1939, Beate fled adventurously with a boyfriend to Jerusalem. Her parents were helped by friends to escape to Switzerland and returned to Berlin after the war. In Jerusalem, Beate went to art school and trained as a gold- and silversmith and moved in artistic circles. She married film maker Rolf Hermelin (8 May 1917 – 1989). In 1948, they came to London where they found a congenial bohemian circle of friends. They built a tiny bungalow in an idyllic setting near Cobham, Surrey and lived there in great contentment. Beate and Rolf regularly took an annual holiday in Zermatt, and travelled frequently to their favourite towns in Europe.

== Career ==
Beate was proud of her unconventional education. She enjoyed German classic literature and considered herself first of all a Prussian. Her schooling was interrupted in her teenage years, and when she was in London, she attended evening classes in Psychology where she was talent spotted by Alan Clark, who later became chair of the Psychology Department in Hull. Alan Clark and his wife Ann were deeply impressed by Beate's intelligence and encouraged Beate to study Psychology and by using considerable diplomatic skills she gained a place at Reading University. After gaining her degree Alan Clark suggested that she do a PhD at the Institute of Psychiatry (now part of King's College London), in the experimental psychology of mental deficiency. Her supervisor was Neil O'Connor, an experimental psychologist who had just completed a groundbreaking study conducted in the field. From this point onwards, a lifelong scientific collaboration had been forged, and Hermelin joined O'Connor on the staff of the Medical Research Council. Almost all publications by these scientists were authored jointly, with strict rotation of the order of names.

Beate Hermelin was a member of the MRC's Scientific Staff from the 1960s until her retirement in the mid-1980s. She never retired but continued to work on projects concerning savant abilities. Even in later life, as Honorary Professor at Goldsmiths College, London, she continued to interact with students University. Some students and close colleagues of Beate Hermelin include Peter Bryant, Uta Frith, Peter Hobson, Feriha Anwar, Barbara Dodd, Pam Heaton and Linda Pring.

== Research ==
Beate Hermelin was a gifted experimentalist who was inspired by paradigms from general experimental psychology to apply them to unusual and difficult populations, that is, learning disabled children, who at that time lived in long stay hospitals and were thought to be ineducable. Jointly with Neil O'Connor she started an important series of experiments to elucidate childhood autism Another of their research projects concerned comparisons of abstract cognitive abilities of individuals with specific sensory impairments, such as lack of vision or hearing. In later years, after retirement, Beate Hermelin summarized her research on savant syndrome, written in a semi-biographical fashion. In all these fields of knowledge Beate Hermelin made major contributions that propelled the field of developmental psychology into the field now known as developmental cognitive neuroscience.
