= Annamaria Petrozza =

American chemist

- Education: Supélec; Polytechnic University of Milan; University of Cambridge
- Scientific career
- Workplaces: Istituto Italiano di Tecnologia; Sharp Corporation
- Thesis: Optoelectronic processes at organic semiconductor interfaces (2009)
- Doctoral advisor: Richard Friend; Ji-Seon Kim

Annamaria Petrozza is an Italian scientist who is senior resercah at the Istituto Italiano di Tecnologia and coordinator of the Center for Nano Science and Technology in Milan. Her research considers sustainable materials for optoelectronic devices.

== Early life and education ==
Petrozza completed her master's degree in electronic engineering at the École Superieure d'Electricité, where she focused on device physics and engineering. She moved to the Polytechnic University of Milan for graduate studies, working in optoelectronics. She earned her doctorate at the University of Cambridge, where she worked alongside Richard Friend and Ji-Seon Kim on optoelectronic processes in hybrid semiconductors. Shen then moved to Sharp Corporation, where she worked on novel photovoltaics. At Sharp, her main focus was understanding the needs of the photovoltaic market.

== Research and career ==
In 2010, Petrozza joined the Center for Nano Science and Technology (CNST) at the Istituto Italiano di Tecnologia. Her research considers new materials platforms for optoelectronics, with a focus on sustainable optoelectronic materials.

== Awards and honors ==
- 2014 Innovators Under 35 Italy
- 2017 Royal Society of Chemistry Emerging Investigators
- 2017 European Research Council Consolidator Grant
- 2022 Materials Research Society Innovation in Materials Characterization
- 2022 Fellow of Royal Society of Chemistry
- 2025 European Research Council Advanced Grant

== Publications ==
- Samuel D. Stranks; Giles E. Eperon; Giulia Grancini; et al. (1 October 2013). "Electron-hole diffusion lengths exceeding 1 micrometer in an organometal trihalide perovskite absorber". Science. 342 (6156): 341–344. Bibcode:2013Sci...342..341S. doi:10.1126/science.1243982. ISSN 0036-8075. PMID 24136964. Wikidata Q34378473.
- James M. Ball; Annamaria Petrozza (2016). "Defects in perovskite-halides and their effects in solar cells". Nature Energy. 1 (11). Bibcode:2016NatEn...116149B. doi:10.1038/nenergy.2016.149. ISSN 2058-7546. Wikidata Q122789351.
- Tomas Leijtens; Giles E. Eperon; Nakita K. Noel; Severin N. Habisreutinger; Annamaria Petrozza; Henry J. Snaith (28 September 2015). "Stability of Metal Halide Perovskite Solar Cells". Advanced Energy Materials. 5 (20) 1500963. doi:10.1002/aenm.201500963. ISSN 1614-6832. Wikidata Q60239725.
