= Lesley Cohen =

Lesley Cohen may refer to:

- Lesley Cohen (politician), member of the Nevada Assembly
- Lesley Cohen (physicist), professor of solid-state physics

== See also ==
- Leslie Cohen, American author of the novel This Love Story Will Self-Destruct
