= Jess Wade =

British physicist and science communicator (born 1988)

Jess Wade BEM
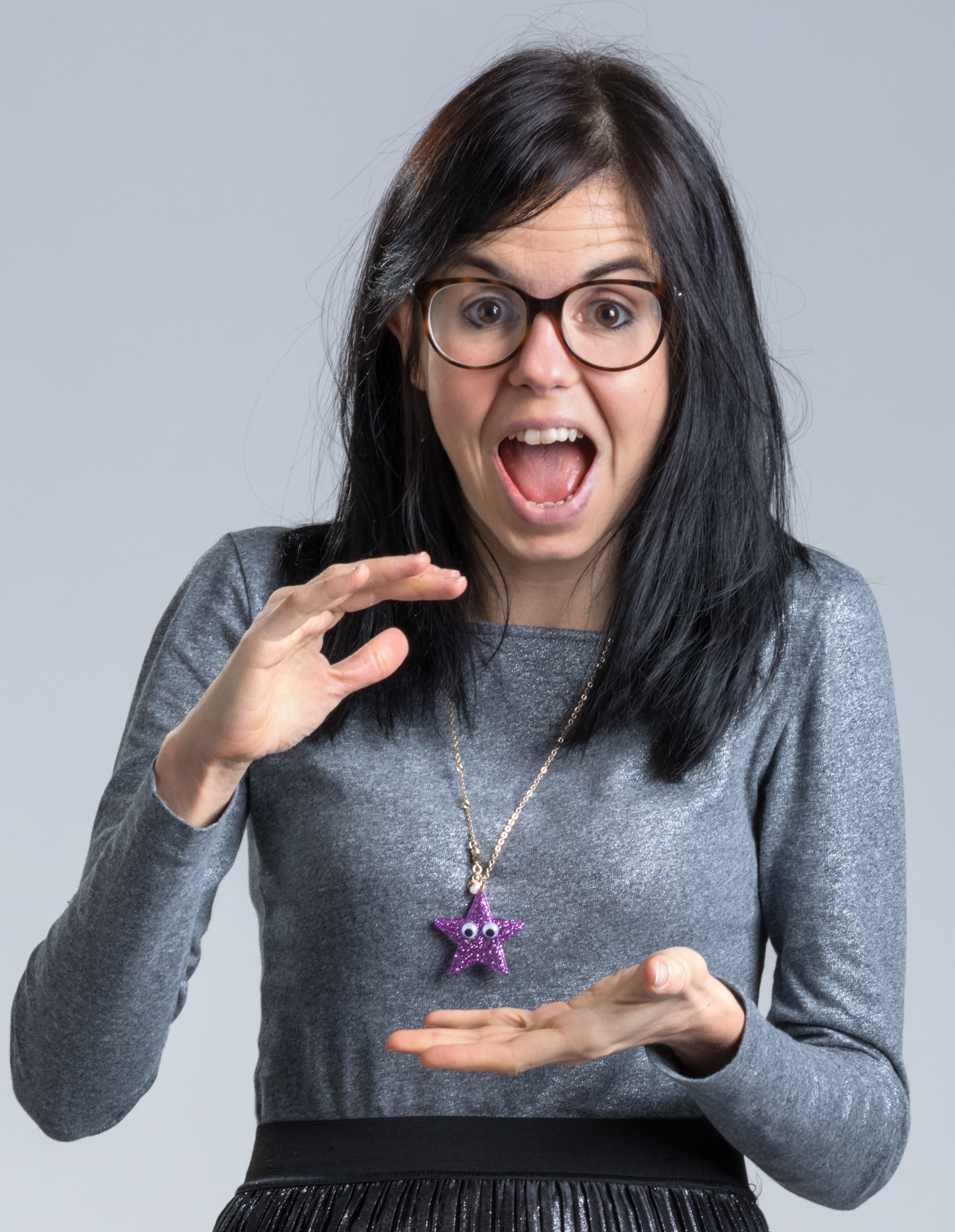
- Wade in 2017
- Born: Jessica Alice Feinmann Wade; Manchester, England
- Education: South Hampstead High School; Chelsea College of Arts; Imperial College London (MSc, PhD)
- Known for: Plastic electronics; Public engagement; WISE Campaigning
- Awards: Rosalind Franklin Award (2024); Royal Society University Research Fellowship (2024); British Empire Medal (2019); Nature's 10 (2018); I'm a Scientist, Get me out of here! (2016)
- Scientific career
- Fields: Materials science Chiral materials Circular polarisation
- Workplaces: Imperial College London
- Thesis: Nanometrology for controlling and probing organic semiconductors and devices (2016)
- Doctoral advisor: Ji-Seon Kim
- Website: profiles.imperial.ac.uk/jessica.wade

Jess Wade is a British physicist in the Blackett Laboratory at Imperial College London, specialising in Raman spectroscopy. Her research investigates polymer-based organic light emitting diodes (OLEDs). Her public engagement work in science, technology, engineering, and mathematics (STEM) advocates for women in physics as well as tackling systemic biases such as gender and racial bias on Wikipedia.

== Early life and education ==
Wade is the daughter of two physicians. She was privately educated at South Hampstead High School, graduating in 2007. Wade subsequently enrolled in a foundation course in art and design at the Chelsea College of Art and Design, and in 2012 completed a Master of Science (MSci) degree in physics at Imperial College London. She continued at Imperial, completing her PhD in physics in 2016, where her work in nanometrology in organic semiconductors was supervised by Ji-Seon Kim.

== Research and career ==
Wade's research interests are in materials science, chiral materials and circular polarisation. As of 2020, she is a postdoctoral research associate in plastic electronics in the solid-state physics group at Imperial College London, focusing on developing and characterising light-emitting polymer thin films, working with Alasdair Campbell and Matthew Fuchter. In 2022, Wade and coworkers published a paper on their discovery of how to template chiral materials at functional interfaces.

As of November 2022, according to Web of Science, she has published 59 items and been cited 1,124 times.

=== Public engagement ===
Wade has contributed to public engagement to increase gender equality in science, technology, engineering, and mathematics (STEM) subjects. She represented the UK on the United States Department of State funded International Visitor Leadership Program Hidden No More, and served on the WISE Campaign Young Women's Board and Women's Engineering Society (WES) Council, working with teachers across the country through the Stimulating Physics Network (including keynote talks at education fairs and teacher conferences). Wade has been critical of expensive campaigns to encourage girls into science where there is an implication that only a small minority would be interested, or that girls can study the "chemical composition of lipsticks and nail varnish". She estimates that £5m or £6m is spent in the UK to promote a scientific career for women but with little measurement of the results.

Wade coordinated a team for the 6th International Women in Physics Conference, resulting in an invitation to discuss the Institute of Physics (IOP) gender balance work in Germany. She also supports the engagement of school students through school activities and festivals, and the organisation of a series of events for girls at Imperial College London, which she has funded with grants from the Royal Academy of Engineering (RAEng), the Royal Society of Chemistry (RSC) and the Biochemical Society. In 2015, Wade won the science engagement activity I'm a Scientist, Get me out of here! and received £500, which she used to run a greenlight4girls day in the Department of Physics at Imperial College London. She has also written children's books, on materials and nanoscience called Nano: The Spectacular Science of the Very (Very) Small, illustrated by Melissa Castrillón, and on light called Light: the Extraordinary Energy That Illuminates Our World, illustrated by Ana Sanfelippo. Both are published by Walker Books.,

Wade serves on the IOP London and South East Committee, the IOP Women in Physics Committee and the Juno transparency and opportunity committee at Imperial. She cites her influences as Sharmadean Reid, Lesley Cohen, Jenny Nelson and Angela Saini, particularly her book Inferior. Her outreach work has been covered by NPR, the BBC, Sky News, HuffPost, ABC News, Physics World, El País, CNN, Nature, New Scientist, and The Guardian.

Wade was interviewed as part of TEDx London Women, held on 1 December 2018. With Ben Britton and Christopher Jackson, she co-authored "The reward and risk of social media for academics" in the journal Nature Reviews Chemistry. In May 2025, Wade was a guest panellist on the BBC Radio 4 programme In Our Time, in an episode discussing the physicist Lise Meitner.

=== Wikipedia contributions ===
Wade has made a large contribution to a Wikipedia campaign that encourages the creation of Wikipedia articles about notable female academics, in order to promote female role models in STEM. Wade has created new Wikipedia biographical articles to raise the profile of minorities in STEM. As of February 2020, she had written over 900 biographies on Wikipedia. By January 2021, this figure had risen to 1,200. By February 2024, it was over 2,100.

On 12 April 2019, The Washington Post published an op-ed titled "The black hole photo is just one example of championing women in science", co-authored by Zaringhalam and Wade, advocating for increased recognition for women who contribute to science. After the first image of a black hole was released, media coverage celebrated Katie Bouman's role leading the creation of the image processing algorithm. The op-ed emphasized the power of social media like Twitter and collaborative information repositories like Wikipedia for crediting women's scientific contributions.

As an example of insufficient coverage in the English-language Wikipedia of women in science, the article points to the deletion of the biography of Clarice Phelps. Wade created a short Wikipedia biography of Phelps in September 2018. The deletion of that article on 11 February 2019 led to a prolonged editorial discussion and its repeated restoration and re-deletion. Katrina Krämer wrote in Chemistry World:

In Phelps' case, her name didn’t appear in the articles announcing tennessine's discovery. She wasn't profiled by mainstream media. Most mentions of her work are on her employer's website – a source that's not classed as independent by Wikipedia standards and therefore not admissible when it comes to establishing notability. The [Wikipedia] community consensus was that her biography had to go.

Wade told Chemistry World she believes such omissions of scientific researchers from coverage in Wikipedia are regrettable, stating her impression that it accepts entries for even the most obscure popular-media figures. By January 2020, there was a consensus to restore the article, as by then new sources had become available. As of 2019, of the 600 articles about female scientists Wade had written, 6 had been deleted for not meeting Wikipedia's criteria for notability.

=== Awards and honours ===
Wade has received several awards for contributions to science, science communication, diversity, and inclusion. In 2015, Wade was awarded the Institute of Physics Early Career Physics Communicator Prize and the Imperial College Union award for contribution to college life, and was the winner of the Colour Zone in I'm a Scientist, Get Me Out of Here, an online science engagement project run by Mangorolla CIC. The next year, Wade received the Institute of Physics's Jocelyn Bell Burnell Medal and Prize for Women in Physics 2016.

In 2017, Wade won the Robert Perrin Award for Materials Science from the Institute of Materials, Minerals and Mining, and Imperial College's Julia Higgins Medal in recognition of her work to support gender equality. She was invited to the interdisciplinary science conference Science Foo Camp at the Googleplex in California.

In 2018, Wade won the Daphne Jackson Medal and Prize for "acting as an internationally-recognised ambassador for STEM". In December she was named as one of Nature's 10 people who mattered in science that year. She received an honourable mention in the Wikimedian of the Year award by Wikipedia co-founder Jimmy Wales, for her "year long effort to write about underrepresented scientists and engineers on Wikipedia", and the following year was chosen as Wikimedian of the Year by her national chapter, Wikimedia UK.

Wade was awarded the British Empire Medal (BEM) in the 2019 Birthday Honours for services to gender diversity in science. Her employer honoured her that year with its Leadership Award for Societal Engagement. Also in 2019, Wade was named as the 44th "Most Influential Woman in UK Tech" by Computer Weekly. During the same year, Casio released a scientific calculator in Spain bearing Wade's picture in a series of 12 calculators commemorating historically notable female scientists.

In 2023, she was one of the six women chosen by Nature to comment on their plans for International Women's Day. The others were Gihan Kamel, Martina Anto-Ocrah, Sandra Diaz, Aster Gebrekirstos and Tanya Monro. Also in 2023, Wade was awarded the President’s Medal for Outreach from Imperial College London for her work in promoting diversity in STEM.

In 2024, Wade received a University Research Fellowship and the Rosalind Franklin Award from the Royal Society for "her achievements in functional materials and outstanding project which will support early career women scientists to pursue academic careers in materials sciences".

In 2025, she was elected as a Fellow of SPIE.
