= Pewsey =

Village and civil parish in Wiltshire, England

Coordinates: 51.339°N 1.765°W

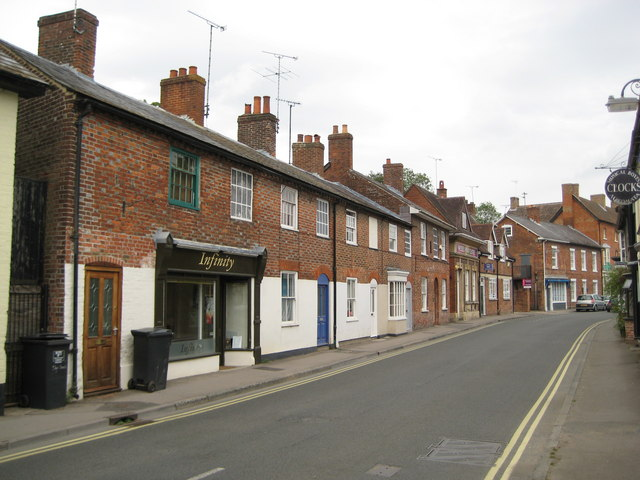
- The High Street, Pewsey

- Flag

- Location within Wiltshire
- Population: 3,797 (2021 Census)
- OS grid reference: SU165600
- Civil parish: Pewsey
- Unitary authority: Wiltshire
- Ceremonial county: Wiltshire
- Region: South West
- Country: England
- Sovereign state: United Kingdom
- Post town: Pewsey
- Postcode district: SN9
- Dialling code: 01672
- Police: Wiltshire
- Fire: Dorset and Wiltshire
- Ambulance: South Western
- UK Parliament: East Wiltshire
- Website: Parish Council

Pewsey is a village and civil parish at the centre of the Vale of Pewsey in Wiltshire, about 6 miles (10 km) south of Marlborough and 71 miles (114 km) west-southwest of London. It is within reach of the M4 motorway and the A303 and is served by Pewsey railway station on the Reading to Taunton line.

The parish includes the settlements of Kepnal to the east, Pewsey Wharf (on the Kennet and Avon Canal) to the north, Sharcott to the west, and Southcott on the south-east.

== History ==
The place name comes from the Old English "peose", or "piosu" meaning "pea" "island," collectively meaning "island, or dry ground in marsh, where peas grow." Archaeological excavations on Pewsey Hill show evidence of a settlement in the 6th century. In the Tudor era, the Manor of Pewsey belonged to the Duchess of Somerset. Several of the village's houses were built in this era: the timber framed cruck house at Ball Corner, Bridge Cottage on the Avon and the Court House by the Church.

In 1764, the founder of the Methodist movement John Wesley (1703–1791) preached at Pewsey's Church of England parish church. The rector at that time, Joseph Townsend, was responsible for the building of Pewsey's first bridge over the River Avon.

The Kennet and Avon Canal reached Pewsey in 1810. Of more lasting effect for the village was the completion of the Hungerford to Devizes section of the GWR's Berks & Hants line in 1862, which allowed fast travel to London and to the West Country. Since 1906, the line at Pewsey has been part of the Reading to Taunton line, a more direct route via Westbury to the West Country.

In 1898 Pewsey Carnival was first held, a tradition that flourishes today with a fortnight of events, including The Feaste, culminating in an illuminated procession in mid to late September.

A prominent statue of King Alfred the Great, the former Anglo Saxon King of Wessex and a local landowner, stands in the middle of the village.

== Pewsey White Horse ==
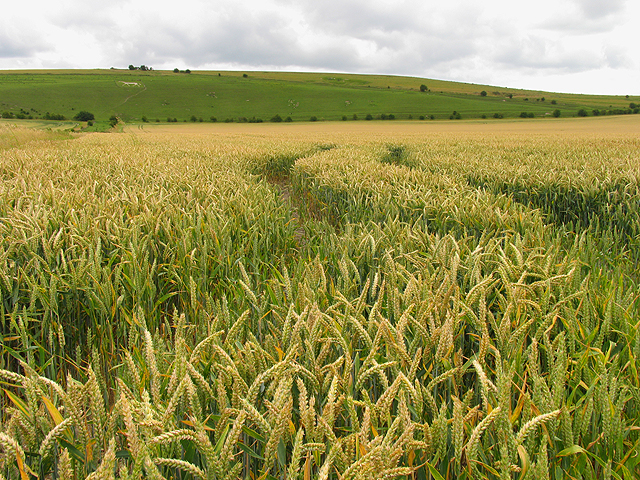
The Pewsey White Horse from a distance

The Pewsey White Horse hill figure is located on a steep slope of Pewsey Hill about 1 mi (1.6 km) south of the village, and can be viewed from several places in the surrounding area. It was cut in 1937 and is one of the smaller Wiltshire white horses. It replaces an earlier one which was possibly cut in 1785.

== Governance ==
The civil parish elects a parish council. It is in the area of Wiltshire Council, a unitary authority which is responsible for most local government functions. The Pewsey electoral division covers the parishes of Pewsey, Milton Lilbourne, Wootton Rivers and Easton Royal, and elects one member to Wiltshire Council.

== Education ==
Pewsey Vale School is a state secondary school, without a sixth form.

Pewsey has a state Primary Academy, Pewsey Primary School which is linked to Pewsey vale secondary school. It appeared in the 100 Most Improved Schools table for its 2013 results and its 2014 results put it in the top 100 schools nationally. An Ofsted inspection in 2012 rated the school as 'good' and this was confirmed by a short inspection in 2017.

St. Francis School, an independent preparatory school, is just outside the village.

== Churches ==
=== Parish church ===
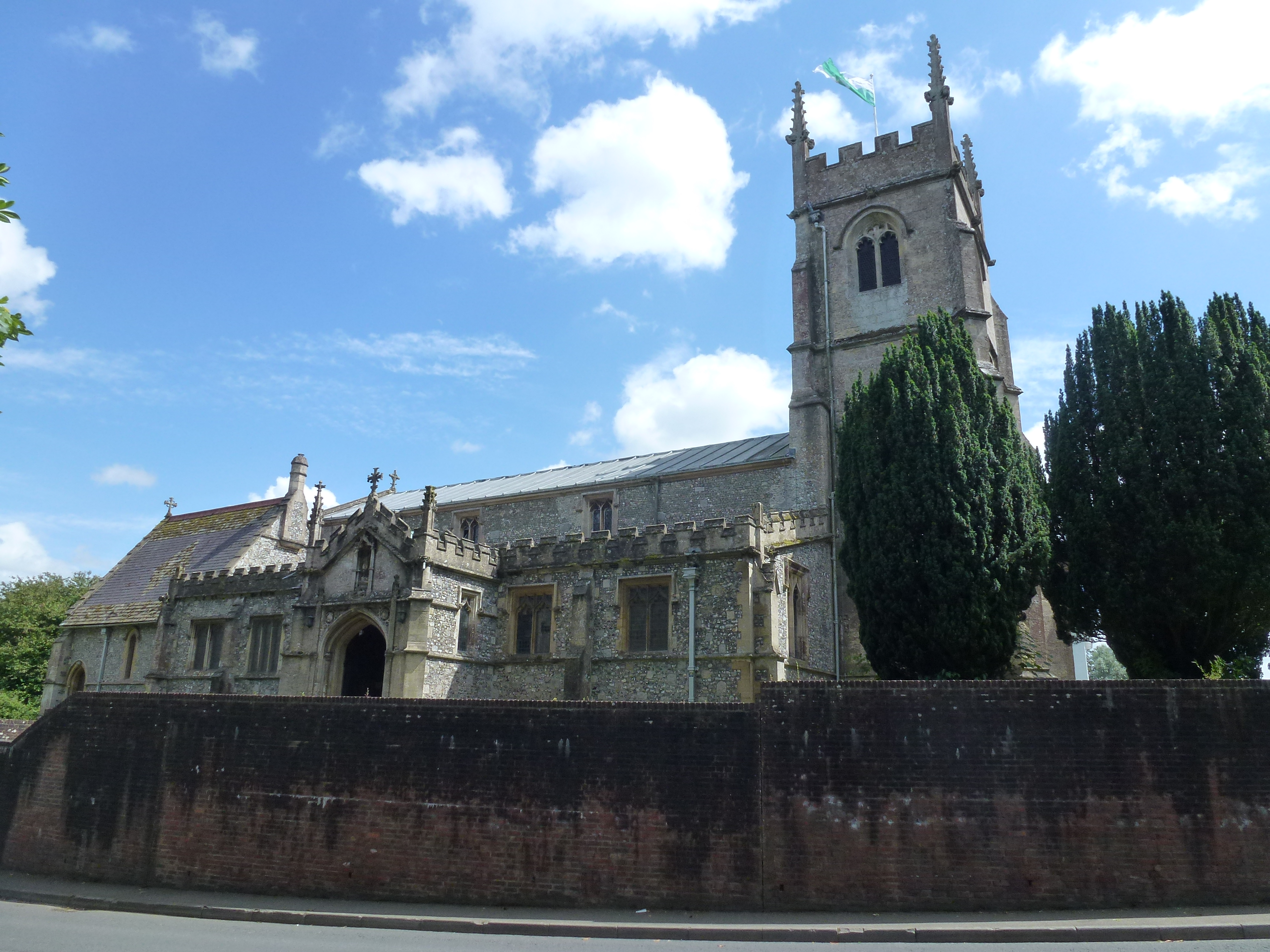
St John the Baptist's Church, Pewsey

The parish church of St John the Baptist stands next to the main road in the south of the village and is built in flint and sarsen with limestone dressings.

A church at Pewsey was recorded in the Domesday Book of 1086. The present building has work from the late 12th or early 13th centuries in the four-bay arcades, on foundations of large sarsens; Pevsner suggests the arches were cut through the walls of an earlier building. The plain font bowl is also from the 12th century. The chancel was rebuilt in the late 13th or early 14th century, the clerestory added in the late 14th or early 15th century, and the ashlar west tower added in the 16th century.

In 1861, G.E. Street largely rebuilt the chancel and added the south chapel, reusing early windows from the chancel. Restoration in 1889–1890 by C.E. Ponting included the addition of the north porch.

The tower has six bells, the oldest cast in 1620 by Purdue of Salisbury; two others from the 18th century are by Rudhall of Gloucester. On the outside of the tower's east wall hangs a sanctus bell cast by James Burrough of Devizes in 1754. The church was recorded as Grade I listed in 1964.

Notable rectors include Joseph Townsend, from 1764 until his death in 1816. Townsend, who lived in Bath, was known for his work in medicine, geology and the theory of economics.

Today the church is central to the Vale of Pewsey Team, which includes many rural parishes around Pewsey.

=== Others ===
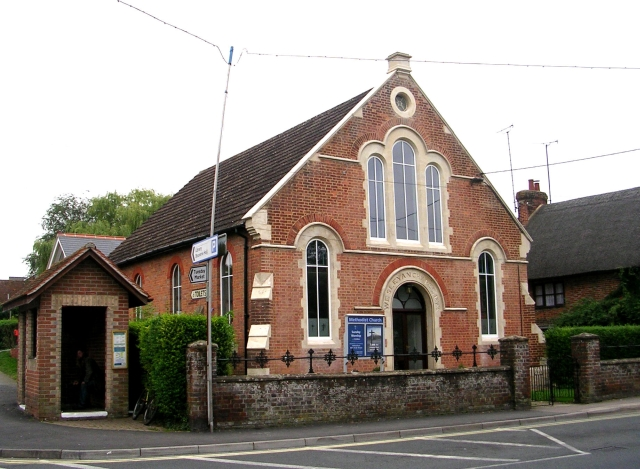
Wesleyan Methodist Church, Pewsey

A Methodist chapel was built in 1873 and became a church in 1932.

The Roman Catholic Church of the Holy Family was built in 1964.

== Amenities ==
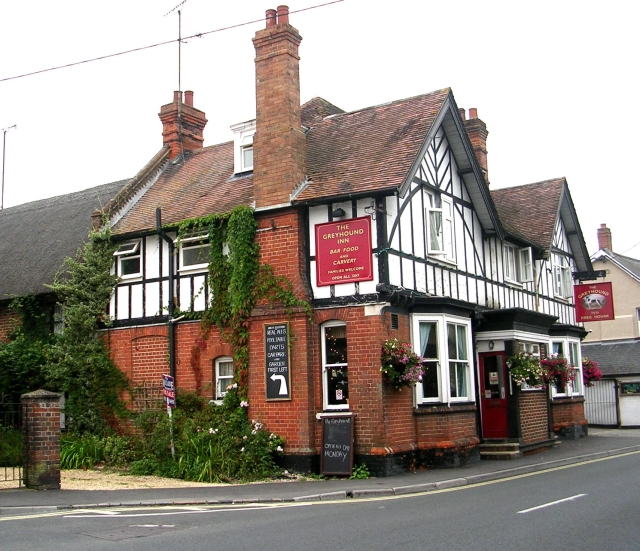
The Greyhound Inn, Pewsey

Pewsey has a post office, a petrol station, and a Co-op supermarket. The village has an Indian restaurant, and four pubs and a micropub.

Pewsey Sports Centre, run by Wiltshire Council, is next to Pewsey Vale School. Its facilities include a 25m heated indoor swimming pool, squash courts and a large multi-sport hall.

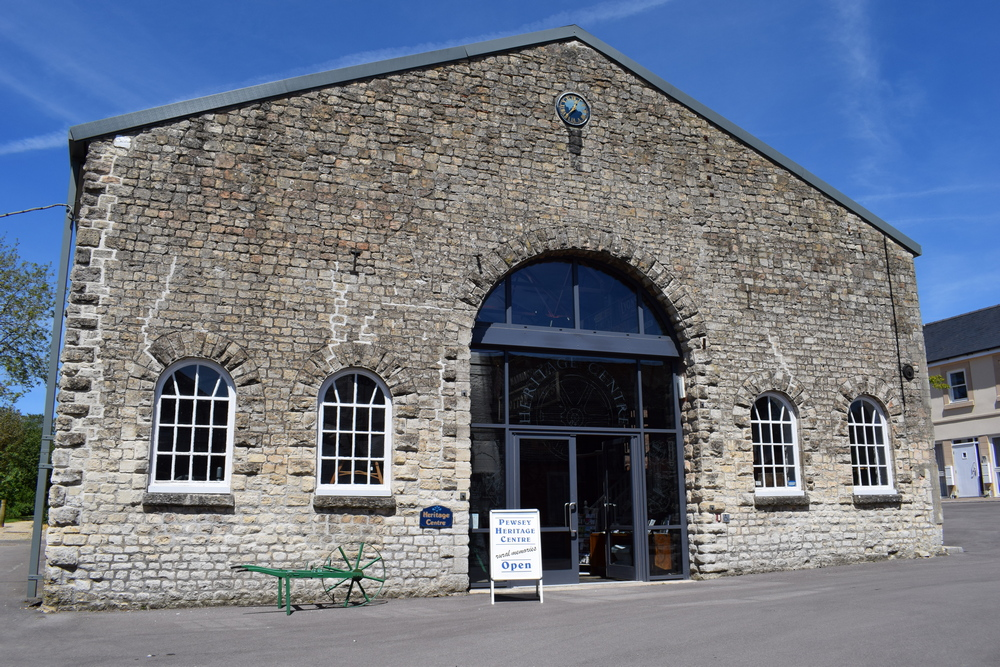
Pewsey Heritage Centre

Pewsey Heritage Centre is a museum run by the local history society, housed in Avonside Works, a former foundry building used by the agricultural engineering firm of Whatley & Hiscock. The company's collection of historic farm machinery forms the core of the museum's collection.

Jones's Mill is a wetland nature reserve by the Avon. Pewsey is connected to London Paddington via its railway station, a short walk from the village centre.

== Notable residents ==
- Richard Hardinge (c. 1593 – 1658), Groom of the Chamber to the then Prince of Wales, later King Charles II
- Stephen Duck (c. 1705 in Charlton, Pewsey Vale – 1756), poet
- Joseph Gilbert (1800 in Puckshipton – 1881), pastoralist and winemaker from Pewsey Vale in South Australia from 1839
- Francis Carter (1851–1935), Anglican priest who served in Cornwall, Kent, East Anglia and South Africa
- Harold Sheppard (1889–1978), cricketer
- Major General Peter George Francis Young (1912–1976), senior British Army officer, General Officer Commanding Cyprus District from 1962 to 1964
- Elinor Goodman (born 1946), journalist, political editor of Channel 4 News from 1988 to 2005
- Moose Harris (born 1967 in Devizes), bass guitarist
- Mary Killen, newspaper advice columnist and TV personality known for appearances on Gogglebox
- Tara Shears (born 1969), Professor of Physics at the University of Liverpool
- Ian Walker (born 1971), former goalkeeper for the England national football team and Tottenham Hotspur F.C.
- Shelley Rudman (born 1981), winner of the silver medal in the skeleton bob, Britain's only medal at the 2006 Winter Olympics

== Sport and leisure ==
Pewsey has two rugby teams and a junior club. For the 2017–18 season, Pewsey Vale 1st XV plays in the SSE South West Division, Dorset & Wilts 1 North League. PVRFC have a joint second team called Alfred's Nomads, shared with Marlborough RFC; they play in Dorset and Wilts 3 North.

Pewsey has a Non-League football team Pewsey Vale F.C. who play at The Recreation Ground. In July 2014 Pewsey Vale Youth FC was awarded 'FA Chartered Standard' Club of the year by the Wiltshire Football Association.

Wiltshire Council run Pewsey Leisure Centre which is next to Pewsey Vale School. Its amenities include a 25m heated indoor swimming pool (used for swimming, float play, kayaking and snorkelling), squash courts and a multi-sport hall (used for badminton, indoor cricket/football/rugby, basketball, volleyball, circuit training, archery and martial arts (judo, taekwondo and kung fu)).

Pewsey has a running club. A Bowls Club is next to the Tennis club. A swimming pool and gym offer a range of courses including spinning and aqua-aerobics.

Pewsey Music Festival, established in 2007, is a celebration of live music held each August in Cooper's Field, behind the Cooper's Arms pub.
