= Kim Ji-seon =

Kim Ji-seon or Kim Ji-sŏn (김지선) may refer to:

- Ji-Seon Kim (physicist) (born 1969), South Korean physicist
- Grace Ji-Sun Kim (born 1969), Korean American theologian
- Kim Ji-sun (born 1987), South Korean curler
