= Nevill Mott Medal and Prize =

Award for research in condensed matter physics

- Awarded for: Distinguished research in condensed matter or materials physics
- Sponsored by: Institute of Physics
- Rewards: Silver medal, £1000
- First award: 2000
- Website: https://www.iop.org/about/awards/silver-subject-medals#mott

The Nevill Mott Medal and Prize is an award presented in selected years by the Institute of Physics in the United Kingdom, for distinguished research in condensed matter or materials physics. It was first established in 1997 thanks to a donation from Sir Nevill Mott's family. Sir Nevill Mott was one of the outstanding British condensed matter theorists and won a Nobel Prize in Physics in 1977. He died in 1996. The award consists of a silver medal and a prize of £1000.

== Recipients ==
The following have received the Nevill Mott Medal and Prize:

| Year | Recipients | Institution | Statement | Reference |
|---|---|---|---|---|
| 2000 | Michael Pepper | University of Cambridge | For pioneering work on electronic properties of low dimensional systems and mesoscopic physics. | |
| 2001 | Manuel Cardona | Max Planck Institute for Solid State Research | For his broad and important contributions to the detailed understanding of the optical and electronic properties of solids. | |
| 2002 | Maurice Sidney Skolnick | University of Sheffield | For major contributions to the understanding of excitons, defects, and interaction phenomena in semiconductors. | |
| 2003 | D. Phillip Woodruff | University of Warwick | For his contributions to the field of surface and interface science. | |
| 2004 | Ted Forgan | University of Birmingham | For his influential work on the study of vortices in superconductors. | |
| 2005 | Athene M Donald | University of Cambridge | For the development of powerful new methods for the study of the properties of soft condensed matter; in particular colloids, polymers and biological materials. | |
| 2006 | Peter Weightman | University of Liverpool | For his work on the electronic structure of materials using a variety of laboratory and synchrotron techniques and for his development of Auger spectroscopy and reflection anisotropy spectroscopy. | |
| 2007 | Andre Geim | University of Manchester | For his discovery of a new class of materials – free-standing two-dimensional crystals – in particular graphene. | |
| 2008 | Gabriel Aeppli | University College London | For his pioneering and highly influential work on the magnetic properties of novel materials using neutron scattering. | |
| 2009 | Gillian Gehring | University of Sheffield | For her seminal contributions to magnetism. | |
| 2011 | Andrew Peter Mackenzie | University of St Andrews | For his major and original contributions to the physics of strongly correlated electrons in oxides, in particular, their superconductivity and quantum criticality. | |
| 2013 | Andrew James Shields | Toshiba Research Europe Ltd. | For his research on semiconductor sources and detectors of quantum light states, as well as their application to secure communication on optical fibres, quantum-enhanced sensing and quantum computing. | |
| 2015 | John Saunders | University of London | For ground-breaking studies at the frontiers of ultra-low temperature physics. | |
| 2017 | Michael Finnis | Imperial College London | For his original, insightful and courageous work in materials physics, which is recognised worldwide as having consistently opened up large areas of materials physics to rigorous theory and computation. | |
| 2018 | Laura Herz | University of Oxford | For her ground-breaking research on the fundamental mechanisms underpinning light harvesting, energy conversion and charge conduction in semiconducting materials. | |
| 2019 | Stephen Hayden | University of Bristol | For pioneering studies of spin and charge excitations in cuprate superconductors and other strongly correlated electron systems. | |
| 2020 | Laurence Eaves | University of Nottingham | For his outstanding contributions to the investigations of fundamental electronic properties of quantum-confined systems and their applications in devices. | |
| 2021 | Richard J Warburton | University of Basel | For pioneering work in semiconductor quantum dots and solid-state quantum optics, especially the invention and application of Coulomb blockade devices to create coherent spin-photon interfaces and quantum light sources. | |
| 2022 | Colin John Lambert | Lancaster University | For visionary theories of quantum-interference-enhanced, molecular-scale electron and phonon transport, which underpin recent designs for molecular-scale memories, sensors, switches and ultra-thin-film thermoelectric materials. | |
| 2023 | Ji-Seon Kim | Imperial College London | For outstanding contributions to the materials physics of molecular semiconductor devices, including the pioneering integration of spectroscopy and simulation to elucidate the key processes determining device performance. | |
| 2025 | Sam Stranks | University of Cambridge | For outstanding contributions to the understanding and development of emerging semiconductor materials, particularly through multimodal microscopy techniques to connect photophysical, chemical and structural properties on different length and time scales. | |

== See also ==
- Institute of Physics Awards
- List of physics awards
- List of awards named after people
