= Stephen Warren =

Stephen Warren may refer to:

- Stephen Warren (politician) (1815-1898), member of the Wisconsin State Assembly
- Stephen Warren (astronomer), British astronomer
- Stephen Warren (geneticist) (born 1953), American geneticist
- Stephen Warren, a character in the film Django Unchained
