= Giulia Grancini =

Italian physicist and Professor of Chemistry

- Born: May 5, 1984 (age 42)
- Education: Polytechnic University of Milan
- Scientific career
- Workplaces: Istituto Italiano di Tecnologia; University of Oxford; Ecole Polytechnique Fédérale de Lausanne; University of Pavia

Giulia Grancini (born May 5, 1984) is an Italian physicist who is a Professor of Chemistry at the University of Pavia. Her work considers new materials for photovoltaic devices, including perovskites and polymer-based materials. In 2020, Grancini was named the Royal Society of Chemistry Journal of Materials Chemistry Lecturer.

== Early life and education ==
Grancini was born in Pavia. She attended the Polytechnic University of Milan. During her doctorate degree she spent one year at the University of Oxford, where she investigated polymer solar cells. Grancini returned to Italy, where she worked as a postdoctoral researcher at the Istituto Italiano di Tecnologia. She spent a year as a visiting researcher at the University of Utah working on the physics of hybrid materials with Zeev Vardeny.

== Research and career ==
Grancini investigates the interfaces of optoelectronic devices, including organic and organic-inorganic perovskites. She moved to the École Polytechnique Fédérale de Lausanne (EPFL) in 2015, where she was awarded a Marie Skłodowska-Curie Fellowship to join the research group of Mohammad Khaja Nazeeruddin. At EPFL she established her own independent research group looking at novel materials for photovoltaics. She was awarded a Swiss National Science Foundation Ambizione Energy grant to study multi-dimensional interfaces for efficient and stable perovskite solar cells. She has pioneered hybrid two- and three-dimensional perovskite systems, which can demonstrate high stability and impressive performance in photovoltaic devices. Grancini makes use of ultra-fast spectroscopies to study the dynamics of the photoexcited states of perovskite materials.

In 2018, Grancini was awarded a European Research Council Starting Grant. Her proposal, HYbrid NANOstructured multi-functional interfaces for stable, efficient and eco-friendly photovoltaic devices, looks to realise environmentally friendly perovskites and metal-organic frameworks. She was appointed to the faculty at the University of Pavia in 2019, where she leads the PVsquared2 team.

== Awards and honours ==
- 2015: Edison Company & Alessandro Volta Foundation National Award for Physics
- 2017: International Union of Pure and Applied Physics Young Scientist Prize in Optics
- 2019: Elected Vice Chair Selection Committee of the Young Academy of Europe
- 2019: Swiss Physical Society Award in Applied Physics
- 2020: USERN Ambassador for Italy
- 2020: Royal Society of Chemistry Journal of Materials Chemistry Lectureship
- 2020: 100 Donne nella Scienza Contro gli Stereotipi

== Selected publications ==
- Samuel D. Stranks; Giles E. Eperon; Giulia Grancini; et al. (1 October 2013). "Electron-hole diffusion lengths exceeding 1 micrometer in an organometal trihalide perovskite absorber". Science. 342 (6156): 341–344. Bibcode:2013Sci...342..341S. doi:10.1126/SCIENCE.1243982. ISSN 0036-8075. PMID 24136964.
- G Grancini; C Roldán-Carmona; I Zimmermann; et al. (1 June 2017). "One-Year stable perovskite solar cells by 2D/3D interface engineering". Nature Communications. 8 15684. Bibcode:2017NatCo...815684G. doi:10.1038/NCOMMS15684. ISSN 2041-1723. PMC 5461484. PMID 28569749.
- G Grancini; M Maiuri; D Fazzi; A Petrozza; H-J Egelhaaf; D Brida; G Cerullo; G Lanzani (9 December 2012). "Hot exciton dissociation in polymer solar cells". Nature Materials. 12 (1): 29–33. Bibcode:2013NatMa..12...29G. doi:10.1038/NMAT3502. ISSN 1476-1122. PMID 23223127. S2CID 205408046.
