= Tara Shears =

Professor of Physics

Tara Shears OBE
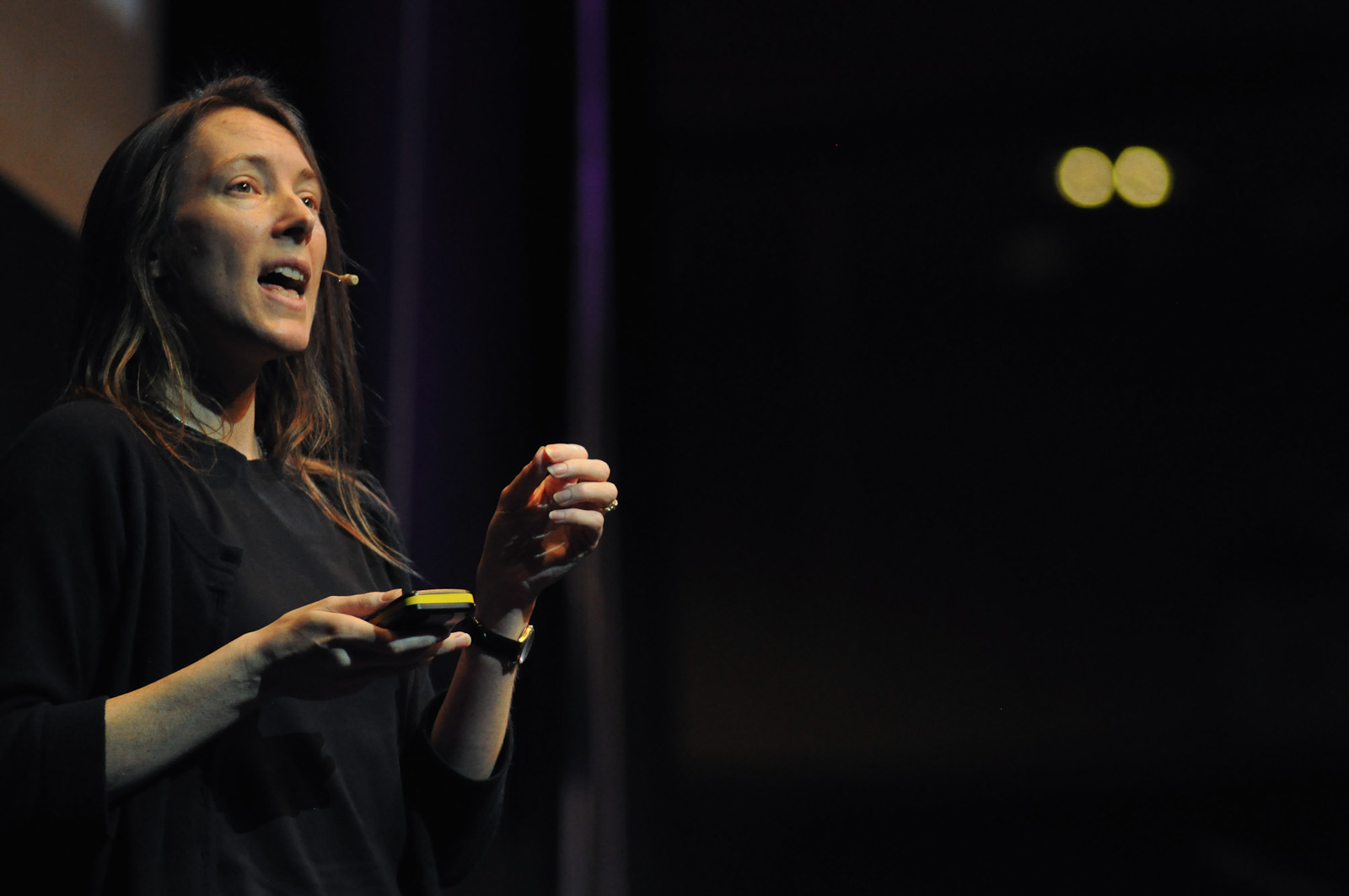
- Tara Shears, 2011
- Born: Tara Georgina Shears
- Education: Imperial College London; University of Cambridge (PhD)
- Scientific career
- Fields: Particle physics
- Workplaces: University of Liverpool
- Thesis: A measurement of the B'+ and B'0 meson lifetimes and lifetime ratio using the OPAL detector at LEP (1995)
- Website: hep.ph.liv.ac.uk/~tara/

Tara Georgina Shears OBE (born 1969) is a professor of physics at the University of Liverpool.

== Early life ==
Shears was born in Salisbury in Wiltshire. She remained in Wiltshire, living in Wootton Rivers and attending the co-educational comprehensive school Pewsey Vale School, where she was inspired by her chemistry teacher. The school had no sixth form, and her parents moved to Wedhampton (near Urchfont), where she attended the co-educational independent school Dauntsey's School, which offered many state scholarships at the time — many of the pupils were state-funded. At A-level she studied Maths, Physics, Chemistry and English, where she was the only female in her Physics class — not uncommon in British co-educational schools, even independent schools. She obtained A grades in all her sixth form exams.

Her experience of being the only female in the Physics class would have been an advantage when she attended Imperial College London to study physics. She obtained a 1st Class honours degree in 1991.

She went to the University of Cambridge to complete a PhD in Particle Physics at Corpus Christi College, Cambridge. She completed a PPARC (Particle Physics and Astronomy Research Council, now the Science and Technology Facilities Council since 2007) fellowship at the Victoria University of Manchester.

== Career ==
=== Particle physics ===
Shears was awarded a Royal Society Research Fellowship with the University of Liverpool in 2000 to continue her work at the Collider Detector at Fermilab (CDF) experimental collaboration at the Fermilab facility in the USA. In 2004 she joined the LHCb experiment at CERN's Large Hadron Collider (LHC) particle accelerator (the world's largest), for which she initiated and developed the electroweak and exotica physics working group.

=== Physics professor ===
Shears became the first female Professor of Physics at the University of Liverpool, where she researches the properties of bottom quarks using hadron colliders, testing the Standard Model theory in the electroweak sector, to seek answers for the reasons that there is so little antimatter in the universe. She is also employed as a science communicator, being able to promote female interest in physics as a role model.

=== National Leadership ===
Shears has been Chair of the STFC's Education, Training and Careers Committee and Chair of STFC Science Board from 2020 - 2023. From 2023 - 2027, Shears is vice-president for Science and Innovation at the Institute of Physics.

In 2025 it was announced that Shears will chair the physics sub-panel for the Research Excellence Framework assessment 2029.

=== Awards and Major Projects ===
Shears was awarded a CERN fellowship to conduct research on the Large Electron–Positron Collider (LEP). In 1995 she conducted a project: A Measurement of the B"+ and B"0 Meson Lifetimes and Lifetime Ratio Using the OPAL Detector at LEP.

== See also ==
- Daphne Jackson, from Peterborough, the UK's first female professor of physics (University of Surrey at age 34)
- Gillian Gehring (née Murray), from Nottingham, the UK's second female professor of physics
- Women's Engineering Society
