= Andrew Peter Mackenzie =

Physicist and educator from Scotland

Andy Mackenzie FRS FRSE FInstP
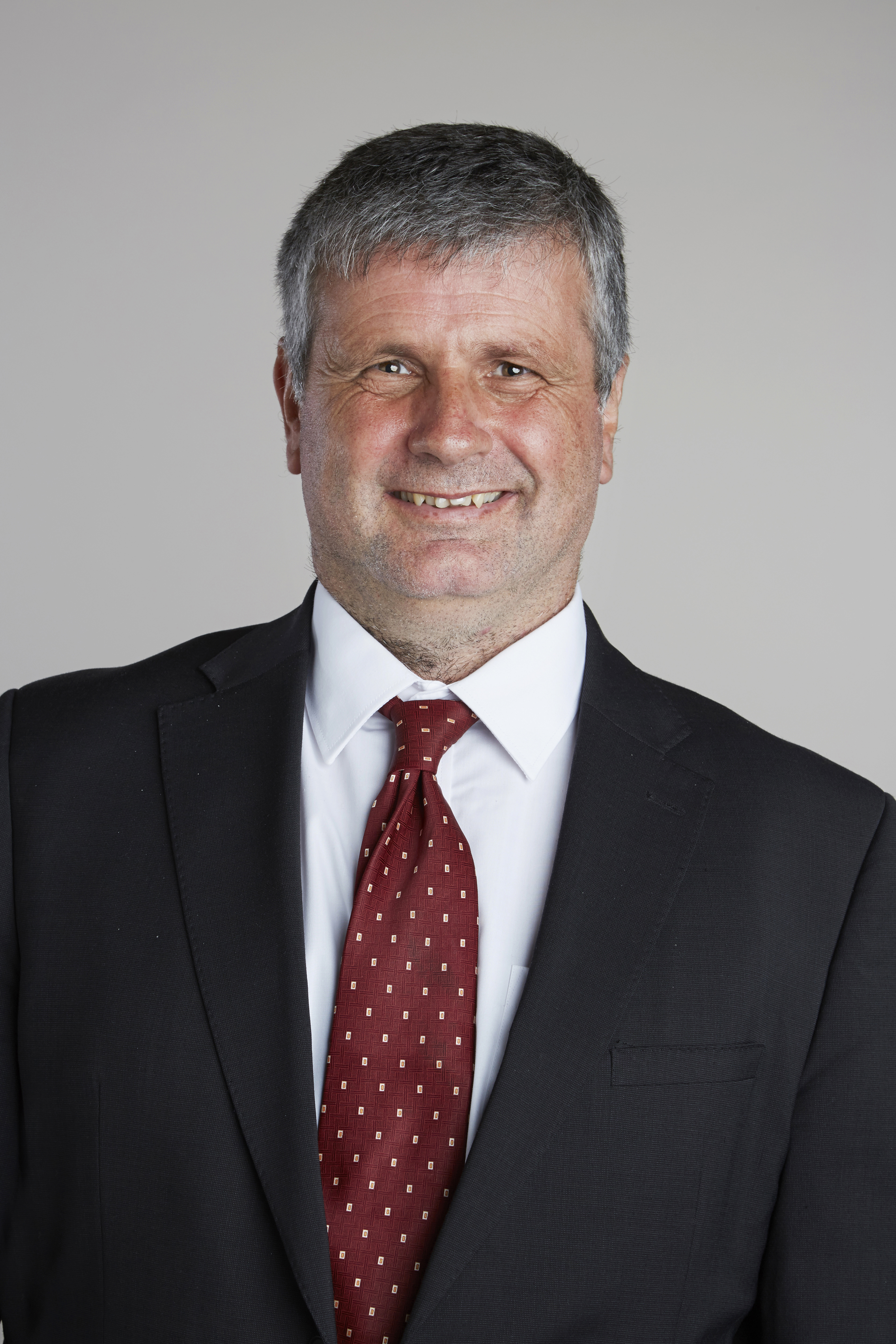
- Andrew Mackenzie in July 2015
- Born: Andrew Peter Mackenzie; 7 March 1964 (age 61); Elderslie, Scotland
- Education: Hutchesons' Grammar School
- Alma mater: University of Edinburgh (BSc); University of Cambridge (PhD)
- Awards: Royal Society University Research Fellowship (1993); Royal Society Wolfson Research Merit Award (2011); Mott Medal (2011)
- Scientific career
- Fields: Fermi liquid theory; Condensed matter physics
- Institutions: University of Birmingham; University of St Andrews; CERN
- Thesis: The role of stoichiometry in high temperature superconductivity (1991)
- Doctoral advisor: Gilbert George Lonzarich
- Website: st-andrews.ac.uk/physics/condmat/mackenzie/

Andrew Peter Mackenzie FRS FRSE FInstP (born 1964) is a director of Physics of Quantum Materials at the Max Planck Institute for Chemical Physics of Solids in Dresden, Germany and Professor of Condensed Matter Physics at the University of St Andrews, Scotland. He was a co-editor of the Annual Review of Condensed Matter Physics between 2020 and 2025.

== Education ==
MacKenzie was educated Hutchesons' Grammar School in Glasgow and the University of Edinburgh where he was awarded a Bachelor of Science degree in 1986. He went on to study at the University of Cambridge where he was awarded a PhD in 1991 for research on the role of stoichiometry in high-temperature superconductivity.

== Research and career ==
Mackenzie is a world leading authority in strongly-correlated systems and renowned for his pioneering experiments in this area. His contributions to this new field of condensed matter physics have been comprehensive, ranging from the growth of the world's highest purity crystals of the materials of interest to the development of techniques for performing extremely high resolution transport and thermodynamic measurements at ultra-low temperatures. His work has led to the discovery of several new quantum many-body states. These include a superconducting analogue of the superfluid He3, a new class of quantum critical states and the first example of a liquid crystal state formed by strongly correlated electrons. He is also leading the way in developing surface-sensitive spectroscopies as future high precision probes of the correlated systems and as part of the long-term quest to see them used in a new generation of quantum electronics.

=== Awards and honours ===
Mackenzie was elected a Fellow of the Royal Society (FRS) in 2015. He is also a Fellow of the Institute of Physics (FInstP), the Royal Society of Edinburgh (FRSE) in 2004 and the American Physical Society, and Director and Scientific Member of the Max Planck Society. He was a co-recipient of the 2004 Daiwa Adrian Prize and recipient of the 2011 Mott Medal of the Institute of Physics, and held a prestigious Royal Society University Research Fellowship (URF) from 1993 to 2001 and a Royal Society Wolfson Research Merit Award from 2011 to 2013. Prize lectures have included the 1999 Mott lecture and a 2007 Ehrenfest colloquium in Leiden.
