= Laura Herz =

Physicist

Laura Herz FRS FInstP FRSC FMRS
- Laura Herz in 2024
- Born: Laura Maria Herz; June 1974 (age 52)
- Education: University of Bonn (Diplom); University of Cambridge (PhD)
- Awards: Nevill Mott Medal and Prize (2018); Michael Faraday Medal and Prize (2024); Rumford Medal (2026)
- Scientific career
- Fields: Condensed matter physics semiconductors Ultrafast spectroscopy Photovoltaics; Conjugated polymers
- Workplaces: University of Oxford; University of Cambridge
- Thesis: Aggregation effects in conjugated polymer films studied by time-resolved photoluminescence spectroscopy (2002)
- Website: www-herz.physics.ox.ac.uk

Laura Maria Herz FRS FInstP FRSC FMRS (born June 1974) is a British-German physicist who is Professor of Physics at the University of Oxford. Her research concerns the photophysics of organic, inorganic and hybrid semiconductors with applications in photovoltaics and solar-energy conversion.

Herz was elected a Fellow of the Royal Society in 2024. Her awards include the Institute of Physics Michael Faraday Medal and Prize in 2024 and the Royal Society’s Rumford Medal in 2026.

== Early life and education ==
Herz was born in June 1974. She was educated at Erzbischöfliche Liebfrauenschule Bonn, an all-girls Catholic gymnasium. She studied physics at the University of Bonn and graduated in 1999. She spent two years as an exchange student at the University of New South Wales. She joined the University of Cambridge for her doctoral studies, earning a PhD in 2002. Here she worked on exciton and polaron dynamics in organic semiconductors.

Herz has appeared on BBC programmes discussing the history and development of science, including the BBC Radio 4 show In Our Time and BBC World Service's History Hour

== Research and career ==
Herz was a research fellow at St John's College, Cambridge from 2001-2003. She subsequently moved to the Department of Physics, University of Oxford and has directed its Semiconductors Group at the Clarendon Laboratory since 2003. Herz was a University Lecturer from 2003 to 2008, Reader in Physics from 2008 to 2010, and became Professor of Physics in 2010. From 2019 to 2023 she served as Associate Head for Research of Oxford’s Mathematical, Physical and Life Sciences Division. She held an Engineering and Physical Sciences Research Council (EPSRC) Advanced Research Fellowship from 2006 to 2012 and an EPSRC Open Fellowship since 2024. She has been a member of EPSRC's Strategic Advisory Team on Clean Energy since 2024.

Herz’s research focuses on the photophysics of organic, inorganic and hybrid semiconductors and on understanding the processes that determine their effectiveness in solar-energy conversion. She uses ultrafast optical spectroscopy to investigate light-matter interactions, dynamics and motion of charge carriers, molecular self-assembly, biomimetic systems and nanoscience. Herz’s work on perovskite semiconductors has investigated the mechanisms governing charge-carrier mobility and recombination, properties that influence their performance in photovoltaic devices. Her research has encompassed a range of emerging semiconductor systems including conjugated polymers, biomimetic porphyrin nanorings and nanostructured semiconductors. Herz’s work has guided materials synthesis, chemical engineering and device development, advancing technology for renewable energy conversion.

=== Awards and honours ===
Her awards and honours include:

- 2026 Rumford Medal, Royal Society
- 2024 Elected a Fellow of the Royal Society (FRS)
- 2024 Faraday Medal and Prize, Institute of Physics
- 2024 Fellow of the Materials Research Society
- 2022 Environment, Sustainability and Energy Division mid-career Award, Royal Society of Chemistry
- 2018 Nevill Mott Medal and Prize, Institute of Physics
- 2018 Friedrich-Wilhelm-Bessel Award, Alexander von Humboldt Foundation
- 2018 Oxford University Student Union Outstanding Graduate Supervisor
