= Asel Sartbaeva =

Kyrgyzstani chemist

Asel Sartbaeva (Kyrgyz: Асель Сартбаева, born 1977) is a Kyrgyzstani chemist and Royal Academy of Engineering Enterprise Fellow at the University of Bath who is known for her work on the encapsulation of drugs in silicon based shells. She is co-founder and CEO of 'EnsiliTech', a biotechnology company commercialising the ensilication technology which allows vaccines to be stored and transported without chilling.

== Early life and education ==
Sartbaeva is originally from Kyrgyzstan. After studying mechanics at the Kyrgyz-Russian Slavic University she was awarded a scholarship to continue her studies at the University of Cambridge. In 2004 she completed a PhD in mineral physics supervised by Simon Redfern, her dissertation concerned 'Ionic mobility in quartz structures'.

After a period at Arizona State University she took up the Glasstone fellowship at St Hilda's College, Oxford and was then awarded a Royal Society University Research Fellowship which she held at Oxford from 2010 and later at the University of Bath until 2019. At the end of her fellowship she was appointed to a lectureship in the Department of Chemistry at Bath.

== Research ==
Sartbaeva's research initially focused on zeolites, naturally-occurring porous minerals used as catalysts in a range of applications including radioactive clean-ups, the production of petroleum products and for improving the effectiveness of cleaning agents like washing powders.

Her most notable research has concerned the development of a methodology for encapsulating vaccines. Many vaccines are only stable in the temperature range of around of 2-8 °C, outside this narrow temperature range the active ingredients degrade, destroying their effectiveness. The storage and transportation is therefore dependent on a cold chain which is particularly vulnerable in low and middle-income countries.

Using her experience in the design, prediction and synthesis of other materials she was able to develop a protocol for protecting the proteins in the vaccine with a silica based coating. The vaccine decay arises because the proteins unfold but a suitable coating prevents the unfolding. A hydrolysed silica precursor is used as a starter to deposit one or more layers of amorphous silica which forms a cage or shell to preserve the shape of the protein. Because of the way the protection works, each coating must have a bespoke shape to fit the molecular shape of each specific vaccine.

=== Commercialisation ===
Sartbaeva was awarded a Royal Academy of Engineering Enterprise Fellowship to help progress the work on encapsulation. The technology which she and her colleagues developed has been patented and in 2022 a biotechnology company, 'EnsiliTech', was established to commercialise the ensilication process. Sartbaeva is the CEO of the company which she founded with three other collaborators.

== Media, awards and personal life ==
Sartbaeva was the guest interviewee on The Life Scientific on BBC Radio 4 in 2026.

She has contributed to a range of women-in-science and women-in-leadership initiatives. In 2017 Global Voices described her as a ‘symbol of resistance to sexism in Kyrgyzstan’ and her work on science outreach to schoolgirls, encouraging them to enter into higher education, led to her becoming UNICEF's 'Goodwill Ambassador' for their “Girls in STEM” programme in Kyrgyzstan. When the Royal Society of Chemistry was celebrating its 175th anniversary Sartbaeva was included as one of the '175 Faces of Chemistry'.

She has received a series of awards for her research and its commercialisation, these have included:

- 2017: The Biotechnology Global award from the Institution of Chemical Engineers.
- 2017: The WISE World award (Women in Science and Engineering) 2017.
- 2019: The Hanson Medal from the Institution of Chemical Engineers.
- 2020: National award for contribution for science and early education from the Kyrgyz Republic Ministry for Science and Education 2020.
- 2021: Woman of the Year, FDM Everywoman in Technology.
- 2022: The Precedent award in Kyrgyzstan to recognise her as "the first internationally recognized female scientist from Kyrgyzstan, for revolutionizing vaccine transportation and storage."
- 2024: Female Entrepreneur Award, EntreConf 2024.
- 2026: The President of the Kyrgyz Republic, Sadyr Japarov, personally awarded her the state title "Jaratman of the Kyrgyz Republic" for her innovative work in the field of vaccine stability.

Her husband, Stephen Wells, is a co-founder of EnsiliTech, they married in 2002 and have a young family.
