= Joseph Townsend =

British medical doctor, geologist and vicar

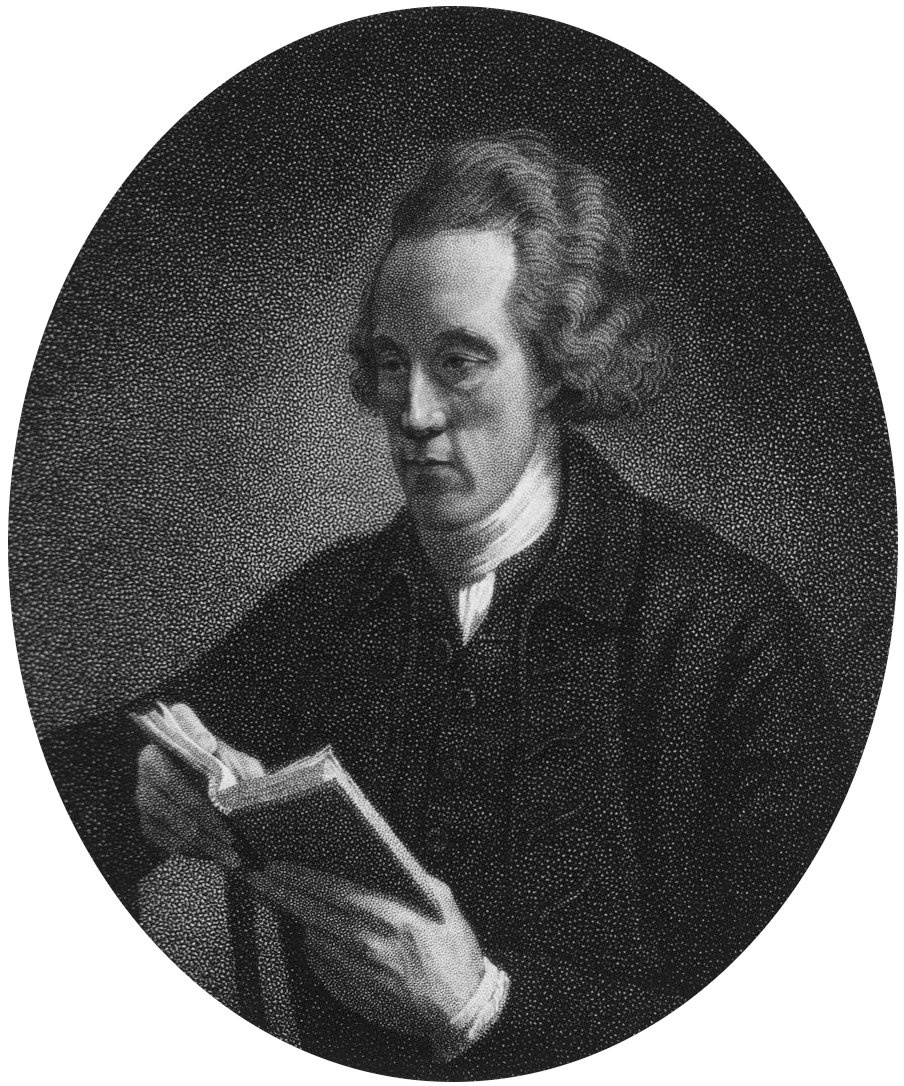
Joseph Townsend

Joseph Townsend (4 April 1739 – 9 November 1816) was a British medical doctor, geologist and rector of Pewsey in Wiltshire, perhaps best known for his 1786 treatise A Dissertation on the Poor Laws in which he expounded a naturalistic theory of economics and opposed state provision, either outdoor or otherwise.

Townsend has been credited with anticipating Thomas Malthus' argument against public welfare assistance in An Essay on the Principle of Population (1798). Unlike Malthus, however, Townsend advocated a system of social insurance through compulsory membership of friendly societies, which would meet the health and burial costs of the poor.

== Life ==
He was the fourth son of Chauncy Townsend, London merchant, mining speculator and Member of Parliament. Educated at Clare College, Cambridge, he graduated B.A. in 1762, then continued his studies at Edinburgh University, where he began to study medicine.

He was ordained in the Church of England in 1763, and ceased his studies in 1764 when his father procured for him the lucrative living of Pewsey, Wiltshire, where he was rector until his death. Also in 1764, he was appointed as domestic chaplain to Jean, dowager Duchess of Atholl.

He was associated with the Countess of Huntingdon's Connection, establishing a chapel on her behalf in Dublin in 1767–8. In the late 1760s he spent some four years as an evangelical orator for the Calvinist wing of Methodism, and he is reputed to have allowed Methodists to preach from his pulpit in the 1780s. He was personal chaplain to the 3rd Duke of Atholl from 1769 and accompanied him on the 'grand tour'.

In the field of medicine, Townsend was noted for the introduction of 'Townsend's Mixture' of mercury and potassium iodide, as a treatment for syphilis.

William Smith, the pioneer of geological mapping, first outlined his theory of stratigraphy over lunch at Townsend's house at 29 Pulteney Street, Bath in June 1799 to Townsend and Rev Benjamin Richardson. He accepted Smith's stratigraphy and published some of Smith's work in his book "The Character of Moses as an Historian, Recording Events from the Creation to the Deluge. Townsend was among those pointing out to Smith that the many layers that Smith identified implied a vast age for the earth. He rejected James Hutton's eternalistic 'uniformitarian' geology. Townsend defended an old-earth understanding of the biblical creation story in The Character of Moses as an Historian, Recording Events from the Creation to the Deluge (1813).

According to Simon Winchester, a biographer of Smith, Townsend was an active member of the regional Highways Trust and, being rather tall and well built, was referred to by colleagues as "the Colossus of Roads".

He died at Pewsey on 9 November 1816, aged 77, and was buried at his church of St John the Baptist, Pewsey.

== Views ==
In A Dissertation on the Poor Laws, Townsend criticized relief as allowing the population to swell by protecting the weak (see his parable of the goats and dogs on the Island of Fernandez), and thus called for the abolition of any state relief in pursuance of greater productivity, as "it is only hunger which can spur and goad them on to labour." (Townsend, 1971:23) In another statement, he more explicitly said: "[Direct] legal constraint [to labor] . . . is attended with too much trouble, violence, and noise, . . . whereas hunger is not only a peaceable, silent, unremitted pressure, but as the most natural motive to industry, it calls forth the most powerful exertions. . . . Hunger will tame the fiercest animals, it will teach decency and civility, obedience and subjugation to the most brutish, the most obstinate, and the most perverse."

== Works ==
- A Dissertation on the Poor Laws, 1786
- A Journey Through Spain in the Years 1786 and 1787, 1791.
- "Townsend Guide to Health Being Cautions and Directions in the Treatment of Diseases", 1795.
