= Suzie Sheehy =

Australian physicist (born 1984)

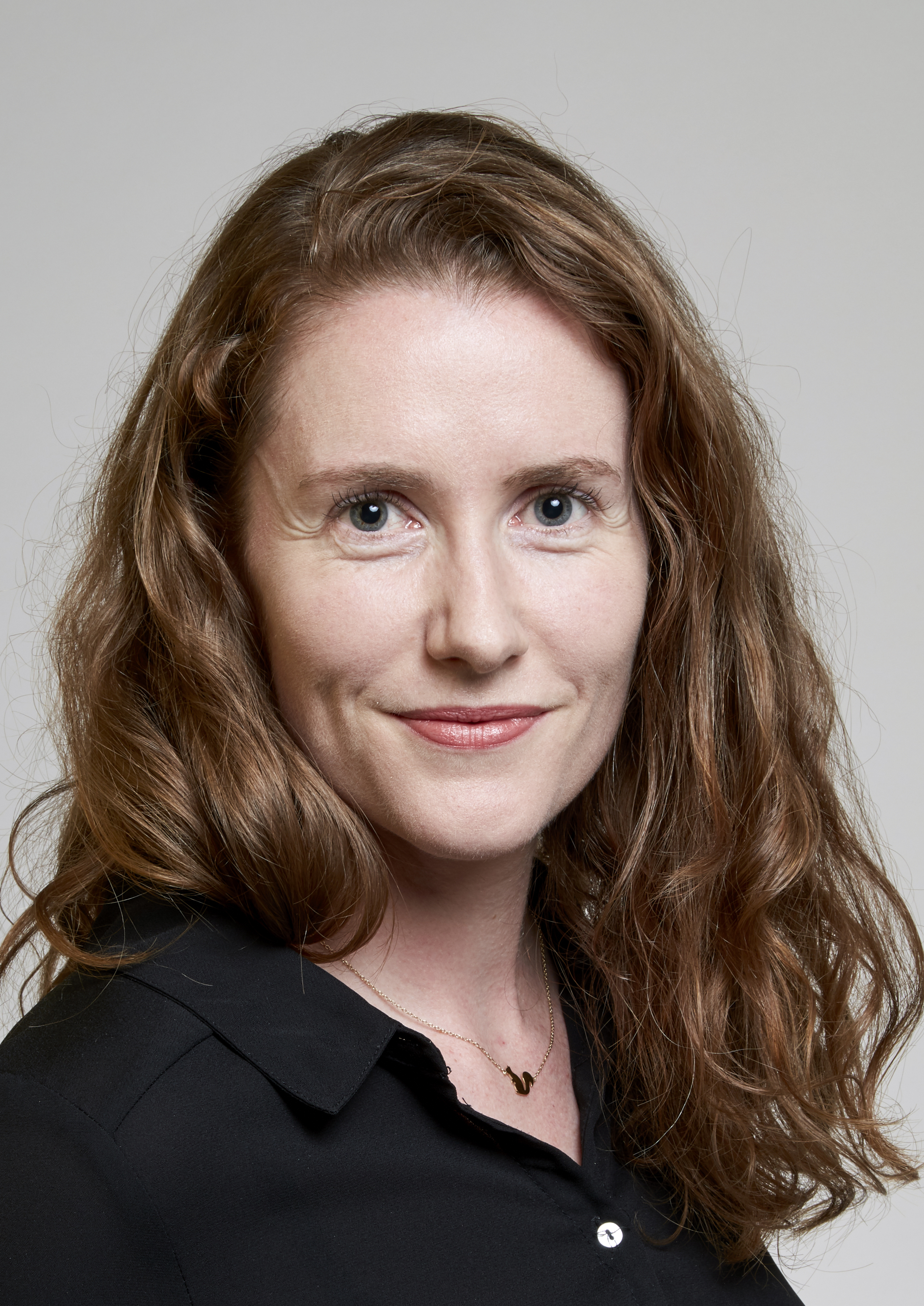
- Suzie Sheehy
- Born: Suzanne Lyn Sheehy; 1984 (age 41–42); Mildura, Australia
- Education: University of Melbourne (BS); University of Oxford (DPhil)
- Awards: Royal Society University Research Fellowship (2017)
- Scientific career
- Fields: Accelerator physics
- Workplaces: University of Oxford; Rutherford Appleton Laboratory
- Thesis: Design of a non-scaling fixed field alternating gradient accelerator for charged particle therapy (2010)
- Doctoral advisor: Kenneth Peach
- Website: suziesheehy.com

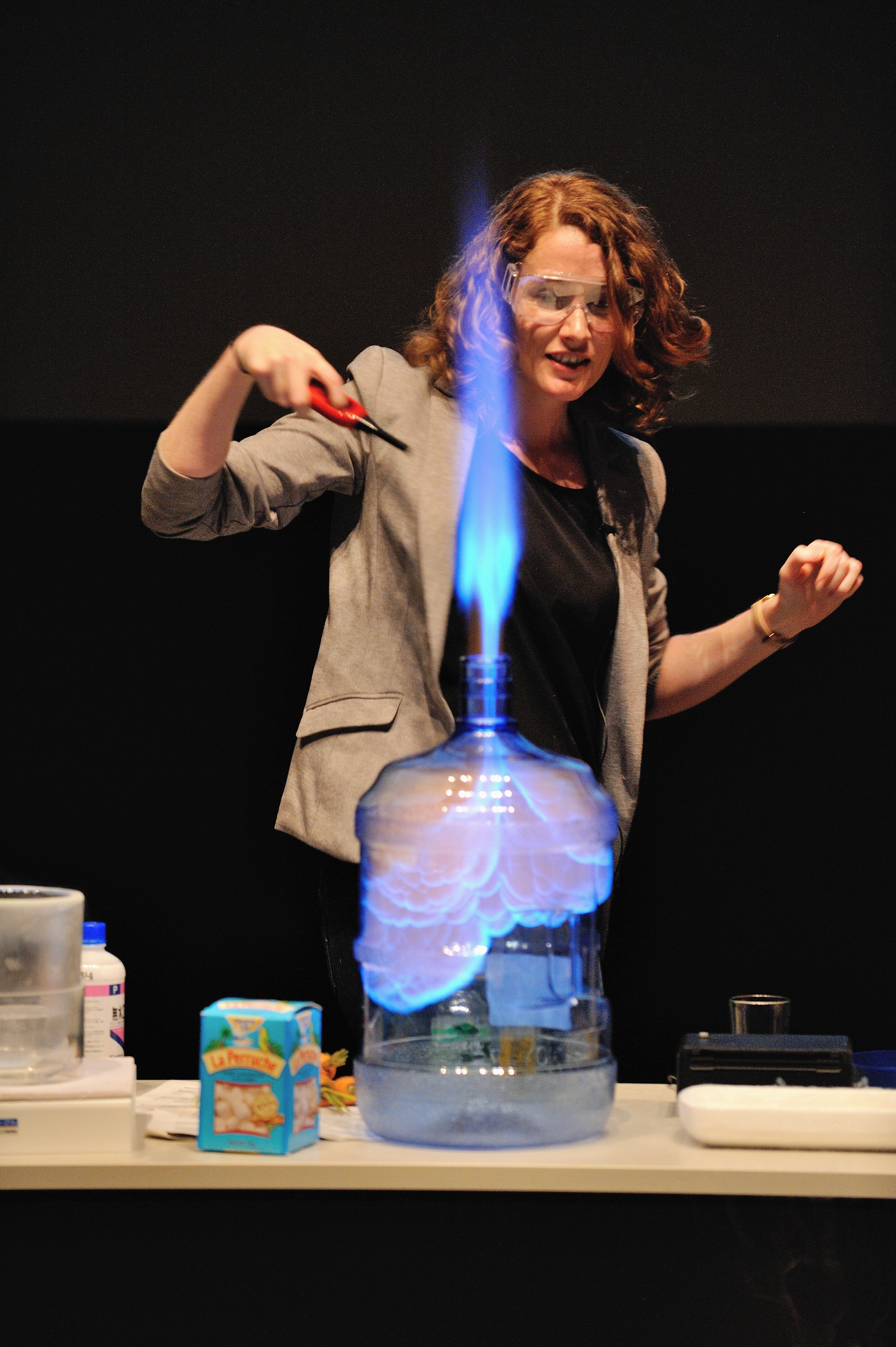
Suzie Sheehy, in 2015.

Suzanne Lyn Sheehy (born 1984) is an Australian accelerator physicist who runs research groups at the universities of Oxford and Melbourne, where she is developing new particle accelerators for applications in medicine.

== Early life and education ==
Sheehy was born in Mildura in 1984. She moved to Melbourne as a child, and was inspired to study physics at a young age by her teachers at Parkdale Primary and Mentone Girls' Grammar School. She completed her undergraduate studies at the University of Melbourne in 2006. In 2010, she earned a Doctor of Philosophy from the University of Oxford, where she worked in the John Adams Institute for Accelerator Science. Her DPhil was part of the PAMELA project, focussed on designing non-scaling fixed-field alternating gradient accelerators for charged particle therapy supervised by Kenneth Peach.

== Research and career ==
In 2010 Sheehy was awarded a Royal Commission for the Exhibition of 1851 fellowship in high intensity hadron accelerators. She was part of the collaboration that achieved the first compact electron accelerator EMMA in 2011. She was appointed to a joint position in Intense Hadron Accelerators with the University of Oxford and Science and Technology Facilities Council (STFC) in 2015, and is now a Royal Society University Research Fellow at the University of Oxford.

=== Public engagement ===
Sheehy is a science communicator and public speaker. Working with Emmanuel Tsesmelis, during her DPhil Sheehy designed a particle physics outreach show Accelerate! for 11- to 18-year-old children in the United Kingdom which later also ran in Germany. She was responsible for training presenters and delivering shows and workshops. The training was delivered as part the CERN teacher educational program. As part of the program, they made a YouTube video explaining How to Make a Cloud Chamber. It has received over 100,000 views. Sheehy worked with the Royal Institution to create videos about particle accelerators. She gave the 2012 National Space Academy keynote talk. She appeared on Discovery Channel's Impossible Engineering. She was a speaker at 2018 TEDx Sydney.

In 2022 she published her first book of popular science: The Matter of Everything: Twelve Experiments that Changed Our World (Bloomsbury).

=== Awards and honours ===
- 2017 awarded a Royal Society University Research Fellowship (URF).
- 2016 Institute of Physics HEPP Group Science in Society Award
- 2010 University of Oxford Vice Chancellors Civic Award
- 2010 British Science Association Lord Kelvin Award
