= Richard Hardinge =

Richard Hardinge (c. 1593 – 24 August 1658) was Groom to the Bedchamber to the then Prince of Wales (later King Charles II of England).

== Background ==
Richard Hardinge was born at Pewsey, Wiltshire. He was the son of John Hardinge of Pewsey and Salisbury and Honora Estcourt. Honora was the daughter of Giles Estcourt, Member of Parliament for Salisbury and Recorder for the town of Poole.

== Education ==
Hardinge matriculated at St Edmund Hall, Oxford University on 20 October 1609, but left two years later without a degree. In 1611 he was admitted to Lincoln's Inn.

== Parliamentary career ==
In 1640 he represented Great Bedwyn in the Short Parliament and the Long Parliament.

== English Civil War ==
In August 1644 Hardinge was the bearer of King Charles II's (whilst Prince of Wales) message to the Parliamentarian General and Lord Beauchamp. Essex refused to make peace with the King and therefore the mission did not succeed. He was a friend of Essex.

== Further service in Royal Household ==
Hardinge accompanied the Prince to Jersey and France and back to England. He spent eight years in exile.

== Death ==
He is thought to have died at Bruges and is buried at Loosdiijnen. There is a portrait of Richard still existing and is in the possession of the current Earl of Clarendon, a direct descendant of Edward Hyde, the 1st Earl of Clarendon. The portrait was painted by Cornelius Jansen of the Flemish school c. 1640.

It was once part of the collection belonging to the 1st Earl at his seat, Clarendon Park, Oxfordshire. He left the collection to his son Henry, the 3rd Earl, who in turn left it to his sister, the Duchess of Queensbury. She took it to Amesbury Park, Wilts., and on her death in 1777, left it to her husband. Later the 4th Duke of Queensbury removed it to Richmond where it was seen by Horace Walpole. Upon the 4th Duke's death, the collection was taken to Bothwell Castle, Scotland and it remained there until the 7th Duke sold some back to the 4th Earl of Clarendon, in whose family it has remained ever since.
