= D. P. Woodruff =

British surface physicist

David Phillip Woodruff FRS is a British physicist, professor at University of Warwick, and member of the Surface, Interface & Thin Films group.. He died in 2026 at the age of 81.

== Education ==
He earned a B.Sc. from University of Bristol in 1965, and a Ph.D.(1968), and D.Sc. (1983) from Warwick University. He formally retired in 2011, but remained research active until shortly before his death.

== Professional career ==
Woorduff is a fellow of the Institute of Physics, and the Woodruff Thesis prize is named in his honour. He won the Nevill Mott Medal and Prize in 2003, and Max Born Medal and Prize in 2011. During his career, Woodruff published over 560 scientific articles.

== Works ==
- D. P. Woodruff, ed. (2007). Atomic clusters: from gas phase to deposited. Elsevier. ISBN 978-0-444-52756-1.
- D. P. Woodruff; T. A. Delchar (1994). Modern techniques of surface science. Cambridge University Press. ISBN 978-0-521-42498-1.
