= Pewsey Vale School =

Location
- Wilcot Road; Pewsey, Wiltshire, SN9 5EW; England; 51°20′24″N 1°46′26″W

Information
- Type: Academy
- Department for Education URN: 136849 Tables
- Head teacher: Neil Pritchard
- Gender: Coeducational
- Age: 11 to 16
- Enrolment: 353 (April 2023)
- Website: pewseyvale.org

Pewsey Vale School is a small, mixed secondary school in Pewsey, Wiltshire, England, for children aged 11 to 16. It became an academy in July 2011.

The school is described by Ofsted as "smaller than the average secondary school". Since 2017, the headteacher has been Neil Pritchard.

== History ==
The school opened on a new site in 1958 as Pewsey Vale Secondary Modern School. Until this time, the schools in Pewsey and the surrounding villages were elementary (all-age) schools but in 1956 they transferred their pupils aged 11 and over to the new school, and all became junior schools. In 1970 a swimming pool and sports hall were built alongside the school, with shared school and public use.

In 1975 the school became a comprehensive under the new name of Pewsey Vale School. Extensive modernisation and expansion of the school took place at this time. There were 407 pupils in 1996 and 426 in 2002. There is no sixth form and children go to Marlborough, Devizes or elsewhere at 16; the school has links with the agricultural branch of Wiltshire College, at Lackham near Chippenham.

In 2011 the school converted to academy status.

In September 2023, the academy was issued with a termination warning notice by the Department for Education. In October 2023, the progress 8 score for the school was released as -1.44, the lowest out of any mainstream school in Wiltshire.

== Ofsted inspection ==
The school was last inspected by Ofsted in February 2023, receiving an overall effectiveness grade of "requires improvement" for the third consecutive time.

Area	Grade
Overall Effectiveness	Requires improvement
The quality of education	Requires improvement
Behaviour and attitudes	Good
Personal development	Good
Leadership and management	Requires improvement
