= Stephen Warren (astronomer) =

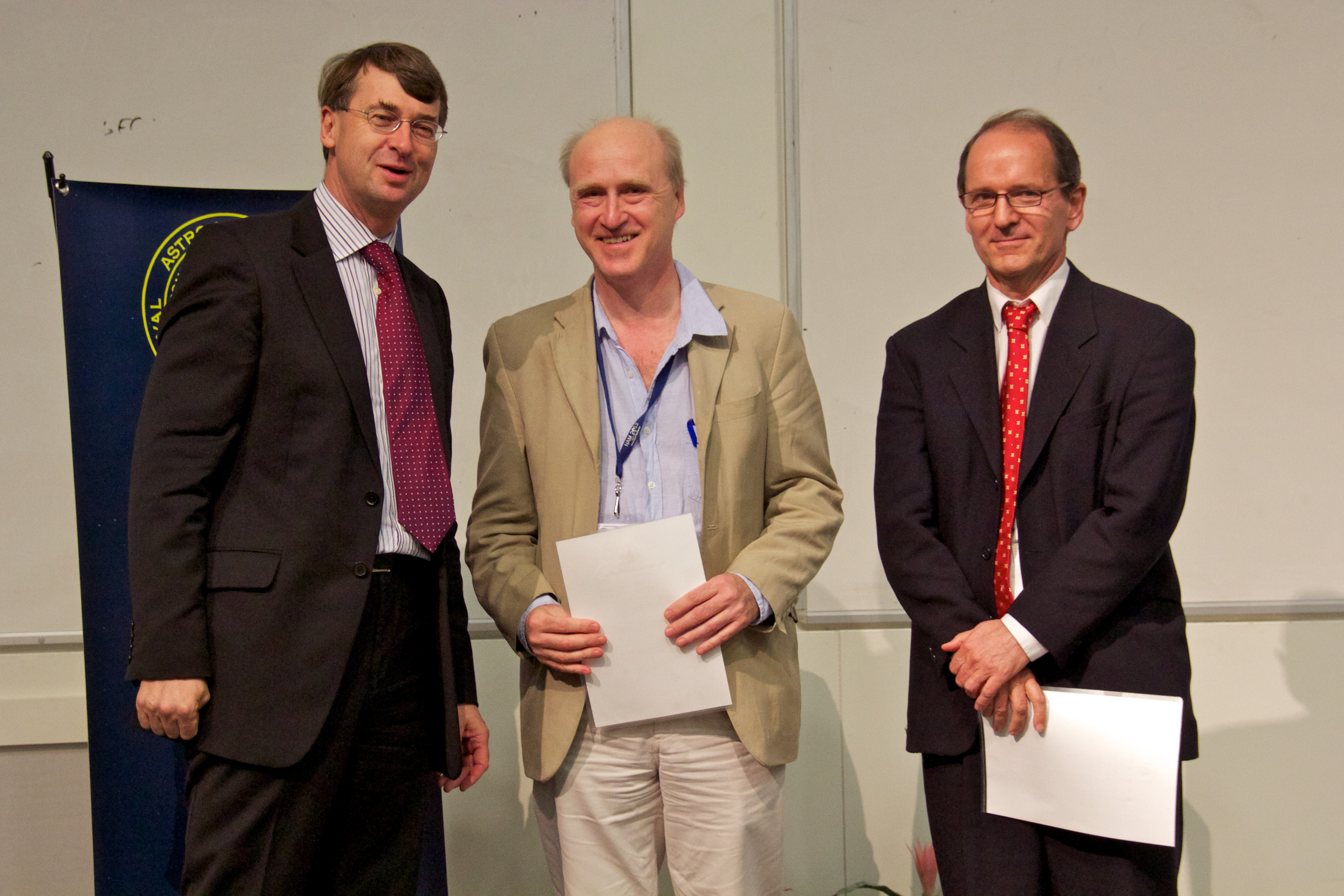
- Stephen Warren (right) with Roger Davies (left) and Andrew Lawrence (centre) in 2012
- Born: Stephen John Warren
- Education: University of Cambridge
- Awards: Royal Society University Research Fellowship
- Scientific career
- Fields: Astronomy; Astrophysics
- Workplaces: Institute of Astronomy, Cambridge; Imperial College London; University of Oxford
- Thesis: The space density of optically-selected high-redshift quasars. (1988)
- Website: astro.ic.ac.uk/sjwarren/home; imperial.ac.uk/people/s.j.warren

Stephen John Warren is a Professor of astronomy at Imperial College London.

== Education ==
Warren studied civil engineering, with a strong emphasis on geotechnics, at the University of Cambridge, gaining a First in 1978. He returned to complete a doctorate at the Institute of Astronomy, Cambridge, which he finished in 1988.

== Career and research ==
Warren joined Imperial College London as a professor in 1994. He has since held a European Southern Observatory (ESO) fellowship and a Royal Society University Research Fellowship.

Warren holds a particular expertise in the field of quasars. Since 2001, he has been greatly involved in the UKIRT Infrared Deep Sky Survey. He was the leader of the team responsible for the discovery of the most distant quasar found, ULAS J1120+0641.

Warren has published over 70 papers in the field of astrophysics since 1987, featuring in journals such as Nature.

== Awards and honours ==
Warren was awarded a Royal Society University Research Fellowship at the University of Oxford.
