= Lesley Cohen (physicist) =

Professor of Physics

Lesley Cohen FInstP
- Born: Lesley Francis Cohen
- Education: Bedford College, London (BSc); University of Cambridge (PhD)
- Awards: Royal Society University Research Fellowship (1993)
- Scientific career
- Fields: Solid state physics Magnetic Materials
- Workplaces: Imperial College London
- Thesis: Microwave investigation of Josephson tunnel junctions. (1988)
- Website: www.imperial.ac.uk/people/l.cohen

Lesley Francis Cohen FInstP is a Professor of solid-state physics at Imperial College London. She works in magnetic materials for solid-state magnetic refrigeration and spintronic applications. Cohen has served as the editor-in-chief of Applied Physics Letters since 2019.

== Education ==
Cohen completed her Bachelor of Science degree in Physics at Bedford College, London in 1983. She moved to the University of Cambridge to where she was awarded a PhD in 1988 for microwave investigations into superconductivity.

== Research and career ==
After her PhD, she joined Polytechnic University of New York as a postdoctoral research fellow in 1988 and was appointed Assistant Professor in 1989. Cohen first joined Imperial College London in 1993 funded by a Royal Society University Research Fellowship. She became a Reader in Solid State in 2003 and a Professor in 2006. Between 2008 - 2013, she was Head of Solid State Physics, one of the largest research groups at Imperial. Cohen is interested in alternatives to standard models of refrigeration, using magnetic materials. Magnetic refrigeration could provide a "green" alternative to traditional fridges, using 20 - 30% less energy. In 2009 her group uncovered the mechanism behind cooling crystals, known as the magnetocaloric effect.

She is co-investigator of the UK Engineering and Physical Sciences Research Council (EPSRC) Research Programme on Nanoplasmonics Reactive Plasmonics.

In 2014 Cohen arranged a Royal Society two-day residential conference on Emergence of new exotic states at interfaces with superconductors. In 2016 she took part in another two-day discussion at the Royal Society, Taking the temperature of phase transitions in cool materials. She is consul for the faculty of Natural Sciences.

Her recent work focuses on exotic properties that occur at interfaces between thin films, at crystallographic boundaries and at vertices in honeycomb structures, working closely with Will R. Branford.

=== Support for women in science ===
As well as being a prominent voice for early career researchers and postgraduates, Cohen is a passionate campaigner for women in physics. In 1996 Cohen created a booklet, Voices from Women in Science, which led to a number of opportunities promoting diversity at Imperial College London. She sits on the Department of Physics Juno committee, which writes the Athena SWAN and Juno applications. Under her leadership, the department was awarded Juno Champion status and Athena SWAN Silver Awards. She is Imperial College's Academic Ambassador for Women and chair of the Committee for Academic Women. In 2013 she was the inaugural winner of Imperial College London Julia Higgins medal.
