= This Love Story Will Self-Destruct =

Novel by Leslie Cohen

- First edition
- Author: Leslie Cohen
- Publisher: Gallery Books
- Publication date: 23 January 2018
- Publication place: United States

This Love Story Will Self-Destruct is a novel by American author Leslie Cohen, published by Simon & Schuster. It is Cohen's debut novel.

== History and background ==
Leslie Cohen studied fiction at Columbia University. The characters in the novel are based loosely on Cohen's friends and roommates while at Columbia. Cohen was born and raised in New York. Various addresses and neighborhoods in the city play an important part in the unfolding of the plot.

== Plot summary ==
Eve Porter is an undergraduate Columbia student studying journalism living on Columbia's Morningside Heights East Campus between 117th and 118th streets with her roommates. She is originally from the Bronx where she and her mother and sister lived until her father left them when she was 13. She later moved to the Upper East Side when her mother started dating her step-father Arthur. Eve's mother worked in the World Trade Center as a receptionist for a law firm before she dies during the September 11 Attacks.

Eve and her roommates throw a party where Ben and Eve have one of their first interactions in the novel. Eve doesn't think of much and keeps her mind set on her romantic interest at the time, Jesse. Jesse is a Columbia student who is an aspiring musician. Jesse and Eve have a tumultuous relationship due to both of their strong personalities as well as Jesse's drug and alcohol use. Ben and Eve share their second encounter while they are both out at a tiki bar in New York. Ben lives in Hoboken, New Jersey and is working as a structural and civil engineer for Skidmore, Owings & Merrill. Ben and Eve have little interaction at the bar, but he listens into Eve and Jesse's breakup as he is walking back from the bar on the Lower East Side.

Eve is working as an assistant at an asset management firm after one of the publication she is working for goes out of business. Following her break up with Jesse, Eve applies for a job at a newspaper in Colorado. At this point in the novel, Eve has a very negative view of New York due to her past experiences and decides it is time for a change of scenery.

Three years later Eve returns to New York after she feels that she has finally had the chance to "really live" in Colorado. She gets a new job working at a music sharing program as a journalist, and she is living in a studio in the East Village. Eve meets up with her college friends and roommates, Maya and Kate, along with Ben's group of friends at a restaurant. After having a lot to drink, Eve and Ben go on the balcony and have their first real conversation. Ben wakes up the next morning in Eve's apartment. He invites her to breakfast and halfway through Eve rushes out feeling that breakfast means Ben wants a serious relationship. After Eve leaves, Ben finds a business card under Eve's seat that belonged to her mother. Ben pieces together that Eve's mother worked for his father and is responsible for getting him out of the building during the attacks. Ben feels guilty since his father feels partially responsible for her death.

Three weeks later Ben is getting pizza, and he runs into Eve about to go to a concert to review for her job. Eve explains why she left at breakfast and invites Ben to come with her. After the concert while they are trying to get backstage, Ben gives back the card, and Eve confirms that it was in fact her mother's. A few months down the line, Eve loses her job due to the website closing down, and she and Ben start officially dating.

After Eve sees her father for the first time after he left, Ben finally decides to tell Eve how he knows her mother. Eve is upset he didn't tell her sooner. At a wedding later on, Ben is in Chicago and Eve goes without him. Eve runs into Jesse there, and they get to catching up. They sneak off to an empty room at the venue, but Eve stops before things get out of hand. Feeling guilty, she tells Ben what happened. and they break up.

Eve moves out after the break up and moves in with her step-father on the Park Avenue. She finds a new job, and on her way to work she runs into one of Ben's old friends. They plot a way for Eve and Ben to get back together after Eve discovers he has a new girlfriend. The plan falls through, but then after finding an old note that Eve wrote, Ben comes looking for Eve and he forgives her.

== Reception ==
Several publications including People Magazine, The New York Post and Bustle gave the novel positive reviews. Booklist named the book one of the Top 10 Romance Debuts of 2018. It was also named one of Buzzfeed's “31 Books That Portray Love In A Realistic Way” and received a starred review from Kirkus Reviews.

The book and its author have been frequently compared to Nora Ephron, by Kirkus Reviews, which said: “An edgy, updated take on Nora Ephron that's full of humor and wit.” Book Reporter also referenced the comparisons, and stated: “Cohen’s debut is a traditional romance with a contemporary twist, a truly 21st-century love story that’s as complex and challenging as the times in which it’s set.” Booklist wrote: “When Harry Met Sally for a new generation, with all the humor, heart, and smarts that writing neo-Ephron entails.” And the New York Post stated, "Think When Harry Met Sally... updated.".
