= Gillian Gehring =

British academic, and former Professor of Physics

Gillian Gehring OBE HonFInstP
- Born: Gillian Anne Gehring; 19 May 1941 (age 85); Nottingham, England, UK
- Education: Victoria University of Manchester; University of Oxford
- Spouse: Karl Gehring
- Scientific career
- Fields: Magnetism
- Workplaces: St Hugh's College, Oxford; University of Sheffield; University of California, Berkeley
- Thesis: Some problems in the theory of ferromagnetism (1965)
- Doctoral advisor: Walter Marshall

Gillian Anne Gehring OBE HonFInstP (born Gillian Anne Murray, 19 May 1941) is a British academic physicist, and emeritus Professor of Physics in the Department of Physics and Astronomy at the University of Sheffield. She was the second woman in the UK to become a Professor of Physics and in 2009 won the Nevill Mott Medal and Prize.

== Early life and education ==
Gehring was born in Nottingham. She lived at 42 Roland Avenue in Nuthall, and attended Nottingham Girls' High School. She was at school with Rosalind Pope, who also studied Physics at Manchester.

She studied Physics at the Victoria University of Manchester from 1959 to 1962 and from 1962 to 1963 she studied for the Diploma in Advanced Studies. She was the third woman to get a first since the war. From 1963 to 1965, she studied for a DPhil in Theoretical Physics at the University of Oxford.

== Career and research ==
From 1965 to 1968, Gehring was a Leverhulme Fellow at St Hugh's College, Oxford, and then a NATO fellow at the University of California at Berkeley. From 1968 to 1989, Gehring was a lecturer in the Department of Theoretical Physics and a Tutorial Fellow at St Hugh's College, Oxford. From 1989 to 2006, Gehring was Professor of Solid-State Physics at the University of Sheffield and was the only female professor in the Physics department.

Beyond her scientific research, Gehring has played an influential role in scientific administration and editorial work. She served on editorial and advisory boards of journals including the Journal of Physics: Condensed Matter, Europhysics Letters, and was a founding member of the New Journal of Physics editorial board.

Gehring has an interest in women in science. She sat on the Administrative Board of the European Platform for Women in Science, served on the Institute of Physics’ Women in Physics Group, and chaired the Women’s Group of the European Physical Society.

She also participated in government working parties such as the one that produced Rising Tide on women in science, and leading delegations at international conferences on women in physics.

== Research ==
Gehring's research field is theoretical and experimental magnetism, and she has made major contributions to research projects concerned with orbital ordering and the co-operative Jahn-Teller effect, a mechanism of spontaneous symmetry breaking that influences structural and magnetic properties of solids.

She was among the first to provide microscopic theories of linear birefringence in crystals undergoing Jahn–Teller and magnetic transitions and to apply density matrix renormalisation group methods to study quantum phase transitions, including generalisations that account for finite temperatures.

At the University of Sheffield, Gehring expanded her research into magnetic oxides and related materials, establishing a research group that became internationally recognised for studies of magnetic properties in mixed‑valent compounds such as Fe₃O₄ (magnetite) and perovskite manganites.

She also helped initiate work on magnetically doped zinc oxide (ZnO) — including some of the first clear evidence of room‑temperature ferromagnetism in Mn‑doped ZnO — a topic of interest for potential spintronic applications.

Her work spans theoretical models and experimental collaborations that explore how oxygen vacancies, cation substitution, and exchange interactions affect magnetic behaviour in thin films and oxides.

Gehring has published over 230 scientific papers, with total citations exceeding 7,000 and an h‑index of about 35, reflecting the broad influence of her work in condensed matter physics.

Her most highly cited papers include studies on ferromagnetism in doped ZnO and cooperative Jahn–Teller effects, which have shaped ongoing research into magnetic semiconductors and lattice–electron coupling phenomena.

In addition to traditional magnetism topics, Gehring’s interests encompass magneto‑optics and the statistical mechanics of soft matter, and her research profile has been highlighted in editorial roles and society memberships in journals and learned societies. She has supervised numerous graduate students guiding 13 to D.Phil. degrees at Oxford and 22 to Ph.D. degrees at Sheffield and continues to influence the field through research collaboration and mentorship.

== Awards and honours ==
- 1992 Honorary DSc University of Salford
- 2004 – Honorary Fellow, St Hugh’s College, Oxford
- 2005 — OBE, 2005 Birthday Honours, for services to Physics and to Equal Opportunities.
- 2006 – Leverhulme Emeritus Fellowship
- 2009 – Honorary Fellow, Institute of Physics
- 2009 — Institute of Physics Nevill Mott Medal and Prize
- 2010 – Honorary Member, European Physical Society
- 2012 – Honorary D.Sc., University of Sheffield
- 2012 – Leverhulme Emeritus Fellowship
- 2013 – Honorary D.Sc., University of Hull
- 2019 – Featured cover scientist, IEEE Magnetics Letters

== Personal life ==
She married on 5 October 1968 to Karl Adrian Gehring at Sherwood Congregational Church. Karl Gehring grew up at 6 Newton St in Basford in Stoke-on-Trent. He went to Adams' Grammar School in Newport, in Shropshire. His father Ernst was from Switzerland, and had come to the UK in the war. Ernest died on 3 November 1988, and had a wife Dorothy.

She had two daughters in 1979 and 1981.

== Publications ==
- Sharma, P., A. Gupta, K. V. Rao, F. J. Owens, R. Sharma, R. Ahuja, J. M. Osorio Guillen, B. Johansson and G. A. Gehring, "Ferromagnetism above room temperature in bulk and transparent thin films of Mn-doped ZnO," Nature Materials 2, 673 (2003). DOI: https://doi.org/10.1038/nmat984
- Gehring, G. A. and K. A. Gehring, "Co-operative Jahn-Teller effects," Rep. Prog. Phys. 38, 1 (1975). DOI: https://doi.org/10.1088/0034-4885/38/1/001
- Behan, A. J., A. Mokhtari, H. J. Blythe, D. Score, X.-H. Xu, J. R. Neal, A. M. Fox, and G. A. Gehring, "Two Magnetic Regimes in Doped ZnO Corresponding to a Dilute Magnetic Semiconductor and a Dilute Magnetic Insulator," Phys. Rev. Lett. 100, 047206 (2008). DOI: https://doi.org/10.1103/PhysRevLett.100.047206

== See also ==
- List of organizations for women in science
