= Royal Society University Research Fellowship =

Royal Society University Research Fellowship (URF)
- Awarded for: Research fellowship for outstanding scientists who have the potential to become leaders in their field
- Sponsored by: Royal Society
- Country: United Kingdom
- Rewards: 80% of basic salary; 100% of research expenses (within the total award value of £1.83M)
- Website: Royal Society Scheme page

The Royal Society University Research Fellowship (URF) is a research fellowship awarded to outstanding early career scientists in the United Kingdom who are judged by the Royal Society to have the potential to become leaders in their field. The research fellowship funds all areas of research in natural science including life sciences, physical sciences and engineering, but excluding clinical medicine.

The URF scheme provides the opportunity for fellows to build an independent career in scientific research. Fellows are expected to be strong candidates for permanent faculty posts and academic tenure in universities at the end of their fellowships. As of 2023, applicants are permitted to apply for a maximum award value of £1.83 million, over eight years. The fellowship funds up to 80% of basic salary costs for the awardee, with the other 20% usually provided by the University hosting the fellow.

Fellowships are awarded annually. In 2022, there were 28 universities across the UK and Ireland hosting 50 newly appointed University Research Fellowships. In 2015, the success rate of applications was 8%.

== Notable fellows ==
Examples of current and former Fellows include:

- Frances Ashcroft (1985 – 1990), Oxford
- Terri Attwood, University College London (1993 – 1999) University of Manchester 1999-2002
- Jean Beggs
- Sarah-Jayne Blakemore (2007 – 2013), University College London
- Richard Borcherds
- Sarah Bridle (2008 – 2012), University of Manchester
- Brian Cox (2005 – 2013), University of Manchester
- Gideon Davies (1996 – 2005), University of York
- Athene Donald (1983), University of Cambridge
- Rafal E. Dunin-Borkowski (2000 – 2007), University of Cambridge
- David Jones (1995 – 1999), University College London
- Andrew P. Mackenzie (1993 – 2001) University of Birmingham
- Zita Martins (2014 – 2017), Imperial College London
- Shahn Majid (1993 – 2003),
- Angela McLean, University of Oxford
- John Pethica
- Tanya Monro (2000 – 2005), for research at the University of Southampton
- Tom Sanders (2016 – 2019), University of Oxford
- Asel Sartbaeva (2010-2019), University of Oxford and University of Bath
- Nigel Scrutton (1991 – 1999) for research at University of Cambridge and University of Leicester
- Beth Shapiro (2006 – 2007), University of Oxford
- Tara Shears (2000 – 2008)
- Suzie Sheehy (2017 – ) for research at the University of Oxford
- Anna Slater (2021 – ), University of Liverpool
- David J. Wales (1991 – 1998), University of Cambridge
- Stephen Warren,
- Kathy Willis
