= Sam Stranks =

Professor of Optoelectronics

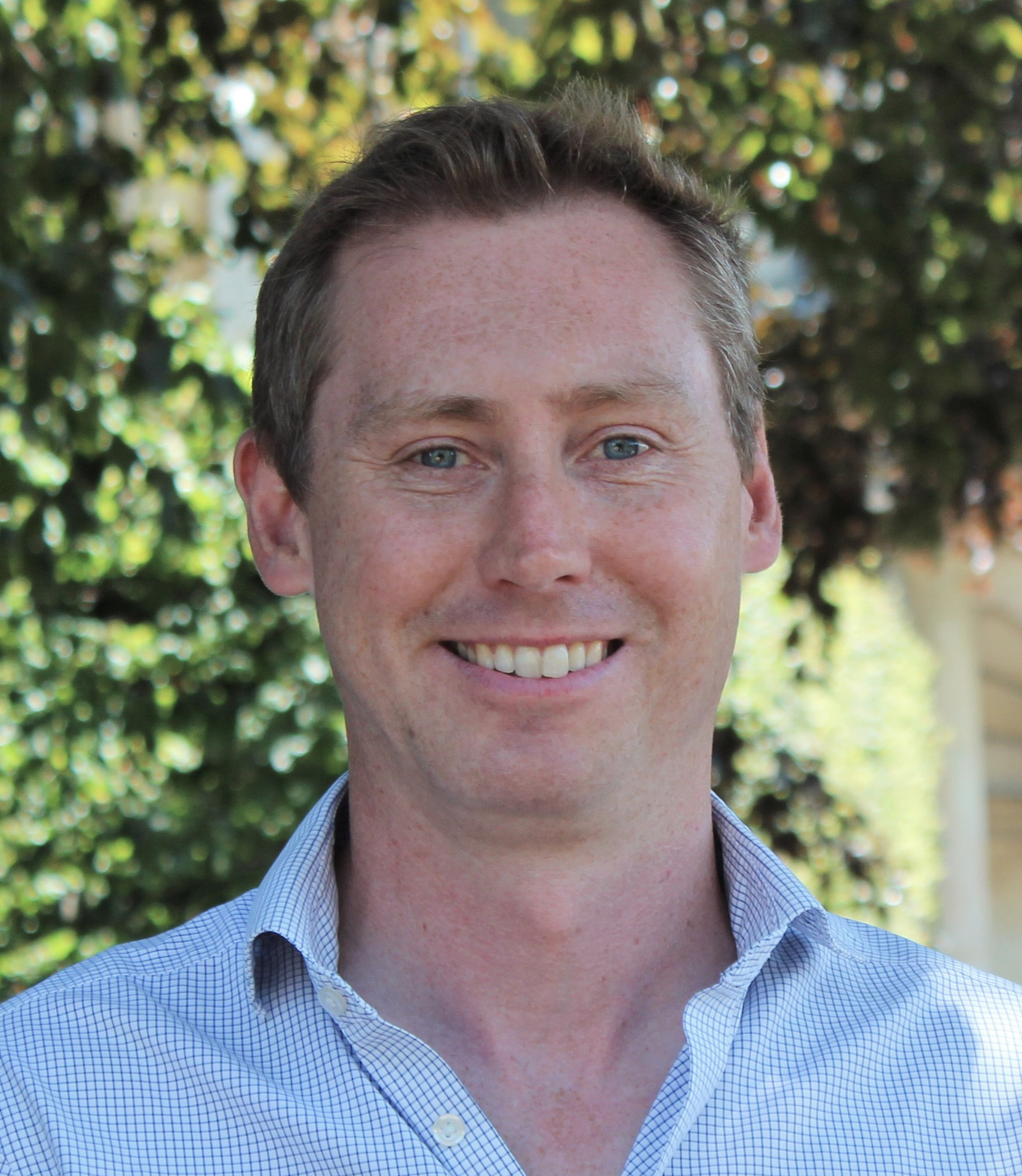
- Born: Samuel David Stranks; 1985 (age 40–41)
- Education: University of Adelaide (BSc, BSc (Hons)); University of Oxford (DPhil/PhD in Condensed Matter Physics)
- Awards: Henry Moseley Medal and Prize, Institute of Physics (2018).; Marlow Award, Royal Society of Chemistry (2019); Energy and Environmental Science Lectureship (2021)
- Scientific career
- Fields: Physics; Solar cells; Perovskite solar cells; Photovoltaics; Optoelectronics; Time-resolved spectroscopy
- Workplaces: University of Cambridge; Massachusetts Institute of Technology; University of Oxford; University of Adelaide
- Thesis: Investigating carbon nanotube - polymer blends for organic solar cell applications (2012)
- Doctoral advisor: Robin Nicholas
- Website: https://www.stranks.oe.phy.cam.ac.uk/

Samuel David Stranks is a Professor of Optoelectronics in the Department of Chemical Engineering and Biotechnology at the University of Cambridge and a Fellow of Clare College, Cambridge.

He is a co-founder of Swift Solar, a startup based in San Carlos which is developing high-performance perovskite solar cells. He is also a co-founder of Sustain Education, a non-profit developing educational materials for school-age children around climate change solutions.

== Education ==
Stranks completed his undergraduate studies in Physics, Theoretical Physics and Chemistry, Applied Mathematics and German Studies at the University of Adelaide in 2007.

He undertook his DPhil in Condensed Matter Physics at St John's College at the University of Oxford under the supervision of Robin Nicholas and Michael Johnston. His doctoral thesis was titled "Investigating carbon nanotube-polymer blends for organic solar cell applications".

== Career and research ==
Stranks undertook two years of postdoctoral research with Henry Snaith as a Junior Research Fellow at Worcester College, Oxford. He then undertook two further years of optoelectronics research with Vladimir Bulovic as a Marie Curie Fellow at the Massachusetts Institute of Technology.

This research focused on demonstrating long charge carrier transport lengths in halide perovskites, enabling planar heterojunction solar cell device architectures, and developing recombination models. It used multimodal microscopy approaches to study local nanoscale material properties, performance, structure and instabilities in perovskite materials.

In 2017 he founded the Optoelectronic Materials and Device Spectroscopy Group Strankslab at the University of Cambridge to research "the optical and electronic properties of emerging semiconductors for low-cost, transformative electronics applications including light-harvesting (e.g. photovoltaic) and light-emission (eg LED) devices."

Stranks is an Associate Editor at the AAAS journal Science Advances, and is a member of the Editorial Advisory Boards for the journals ACS Energy Letters and Advanced Energy Materials.

== Awards and honours ==
In 2018, Stranks received the Institute of Physics Henry Moseley Medal and Prize. In 2019, Stranks was awarded the Royal Society of Chemistry Marlow award.

In 2021, Stranks received the Institute of Electrical and Electronics Engineers Stuart R. Wenham Young Professional award. He was also awarded the Phillip Leverhulme Prize in Physics and received the 2021 Royal Society of Chemistry Energy and Environmental Science Lectureship for his "contributions to the field of halide perovskite optoelectronics, including understanding carrier recombination, complex structure-function relationships and device performance"

In 2022, he was awarded the Stanisław Lem European Research Prize.
