= Ji-Seon Kim =

South Korean physicist

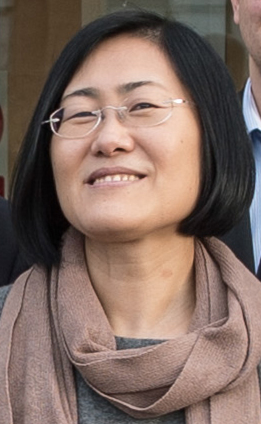
- Education: Ewha Womans University; University of Cambridge (PhD)
- Awards: 2003 Descartes Prize; 2023 Nevill Mott Medal
- Scientific career
- Workplaces: Imperial College London
- Thesis: Polymer light-emitting diodes : anode surface conditioning and device performance (2000)
- Doctoral students: Jess Wade

Korean name
- Hangul: 김지선
- RR: Gim Jiseon
- MR: Kim Chisŏn
- Website: imperial.ac.uk/people/ji-seon.kim

Ji-Seon Kim is a South Korean physicist. She is a Professor in the Department of Physics and Centre for Plastic Electronics at Imperial College London.

== Early life and education ==
Kim grew up in South Korea, and received a BSc in physics at Ewha Womans University in 1992. She completed a theoretical physics MSc under the supervision of Prof. Jeong Weon Wu in 1994 before moving to the UK to work at the University of Cambridge. Here she joined the growing research group of Professor Richard Friend, earning a PhD entitled Polymer Light-Emitting Diodes: Anode Surface Conditioning and Device Performance in 2000.

== Research and career ==
Whilst at Cambridge Kim secured an EPSRC Advanced Research Fellowship for the Optoelectronics group and carried out fundamental research into organic semiconducting materials whilst acting as a technical consultant for Cambridge Display technology. Kim's research is focussed on nanoanalysis of printed electronic materials, establishing novel printing processes and developing new characterisation techniques. In 2003, she was part of the team who won the Descartes Prize of the European Commission for polymer-based light emitting diodes. Kim joined Imperial College London in 2007 as a lecturer in the Solid State group, where her group have identified spectroscopic and scanning probe techniques that can identify the microstructure and change transport mechanisms within organic materials. She is a specialist in Resonant Raman Spectroscopy.

Today she is a Professor of Solid State physics at Imperial College London and a Visiting Professors in Materials Science and Engineering at KAIST, South Korea. She is the director of EPSRC Centre for Doctoral Training in Plastic Electronic Materials at Imperial College London. Kim has been involved in strengthening UK-Korea ties, creating strategic partnerships with KAIST and GIST. In 2016 she signed a memorandum of understanding, creating the GIST-ICL research and development centre.

== Awards ==
- 2023 Nevill Mott Medal and Prize
