= Advanced Energy Materials =

- Discipline: Materials science
- Language: English
- Edited by: Christoph Brabec, Manfred Waidhas

Publication details
- History: 2011–present
- Publisher: Wiley-VCH
- Frequency: Weekly
- Impact factor: 24.4 (2023)

Standard abbreviations
- ISO 4: Adv. Energy Mater.

Indexing
- CODEN: ADEMBC
- ISSN: 1614-6832 (print); 1614-6840 (web)
- LCCN: 2011205934
- OCLC no.: 708549956

Links
- Journal homepage; Online access; Online archive

Advanced Energy Materials is a peer-reviewed scientific journal covering energy-related research, including photovoltaics, batteries, supercapacitors, fuel cells, hydrogen technologies, thermoelectrics, photocatalysis, solar power technologies, magnetic refrigeration, and piezoelectric materials. It publishes invited reviews and progress reports, full papers, and rapid communications. Established in 2011, Adv. Energy Mater. began as a monthly journal in 2012 and switched to 18/year in 2014, biweekly in 2016, 36/year in 2018, and weekly in 2019.

== Abstracting and indexing ==
The journal is abstracted and indexed in:

- Chemistry Citation Index
- Current Contents/Engineering, Computing & Technology
- Current Contents/Physical, Chemical & Earth Sciences
- ENERGY
- Inspec
- Materials Science Citation Index
- Science Citation Index Expanded
