= Steve Mould =

English YouTuber (born 1978)

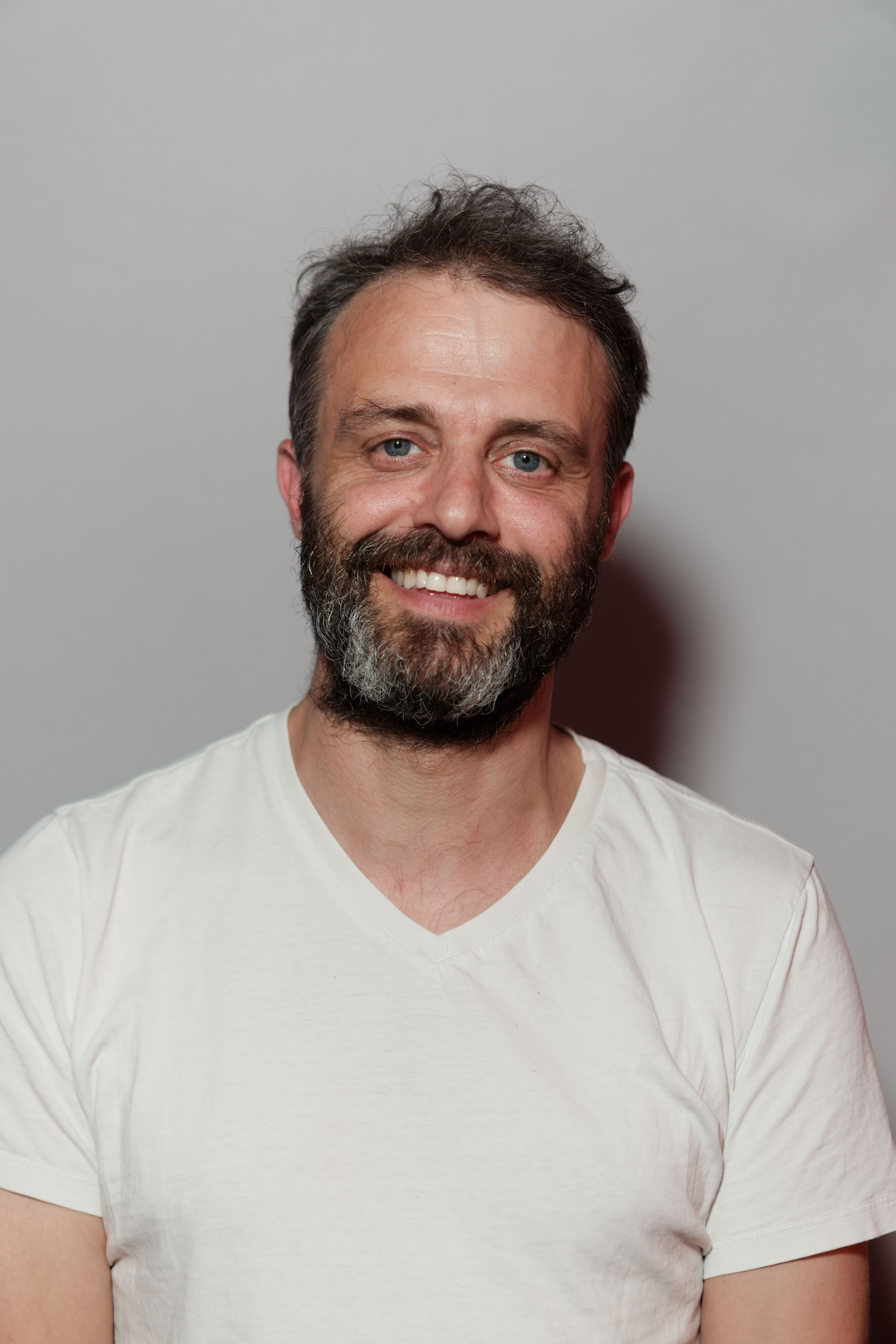
- Mould in 2026
- Born: 5 October 1978 (age 48); Gateshead, England
- Education: University of Oxford (MPhys)

YouTube information
- Channel: Steve Mould
- Years active: 2006–present
- Genre: Edutainment
- Subscribers: 3.61 million
- Views: 1.1 billion
- Last updated: September 13, 2026
- Website: stevemould.com

Steven Mould (born 5 October 1978) is an English educational author and science presenter who is most notable for making science-related educational videos on his YouTube channel. He is known for his series of videos on the chain fountain phenomenon.

== Early life ==
Mould was born on 5 October 1978 in Gateshead, United Kingdom. He went to St Thomas More Catholic School, Blaydon, before going on to study physics at St Hugh's College, Oxford.

== Career ==
In 2014, Mould co-hosted ITV's I Never Knew That About Britain alongside Paul Martin and Suzannah Lipscomb. He has also appeared as a science expert on The Alan Titchmarsh Show, The One Show, and Blue Peter.

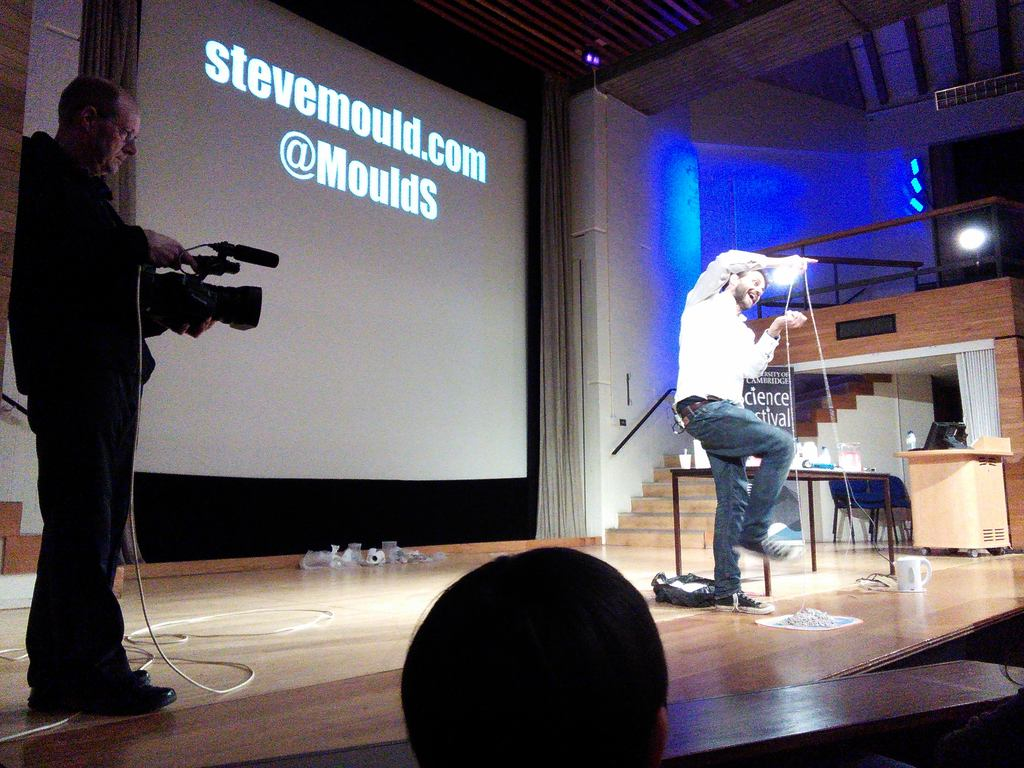
Mould explaining the self-siphoning chain fountain at the 2015 Cambridge Science Festival

Mould's YouTube video on rising self-siphoning beads, in which he demonstrated the phenomenon and proposed an explanation, brought the problem to the attention of academics John Biggins and Mark Warner of Cambridge University, who published their findings about what has now been called the "chain fountain" in Proceedings of the Royal Society A. Warner referred to it as the "Mould effect."

Between 2008 and 2010, Mould performed three sketch shows at the Edinburgh Festival Fringe with Gemma Arrowsmith. Since 2011, Steve has performed live science comedy as part of the comedic trio Festival of the Spoken Nerd, with mathematician Matt Parker and physicist singer Helen Arney. Festival of the Spoken Nerd has performed at theatres as well as science and arts festivals. The two main belt asteroids 314159 Mattparker and 628318 Stevemould have been named after Parker and Mould, respectively, recognising their enthusiasm regarding the mathematical constants pi and tau, including their challenges involving calculations of the constants by hand. (Note: 314159 are the first six digits of pi; 628318 are the first six digits of tau.)

In 2011 Mould and Parker together started MathsGear.co.uk, a website aimed at selling stuff they prepare for their mathematics shows. Mould's motive for starting the website was the constant inquiry from people to buy the stuff used in their shows.

== Personal life ==
Mould lives in London with his wife Lianne, who is a linguist, and their children.
