= I Never Knew That About Britain =

British television series

- Genre: Factual
- Presented by: Paul Martin
- Starring: Suzannah Lipscomb; Steve Mould
- Country of origin: United Kingdom
- Original language: English
- No. of series: 1
- No. of episodes: 8

Production
- Running time: 30 minutes (inc. adverts)
- Production company: Potato

Original release
- Network: ITV
- Release: 3 March – 21 April 2014

I Never Knew That About Britain is a British factual show that aired on ITV from 3 March to 21 April 2014 and was hosted by Paul Martin with reporters Suzannah Lipscomb and Steve Mould.
