= Helen Arney =

British presenter, stand-up comedian and musician

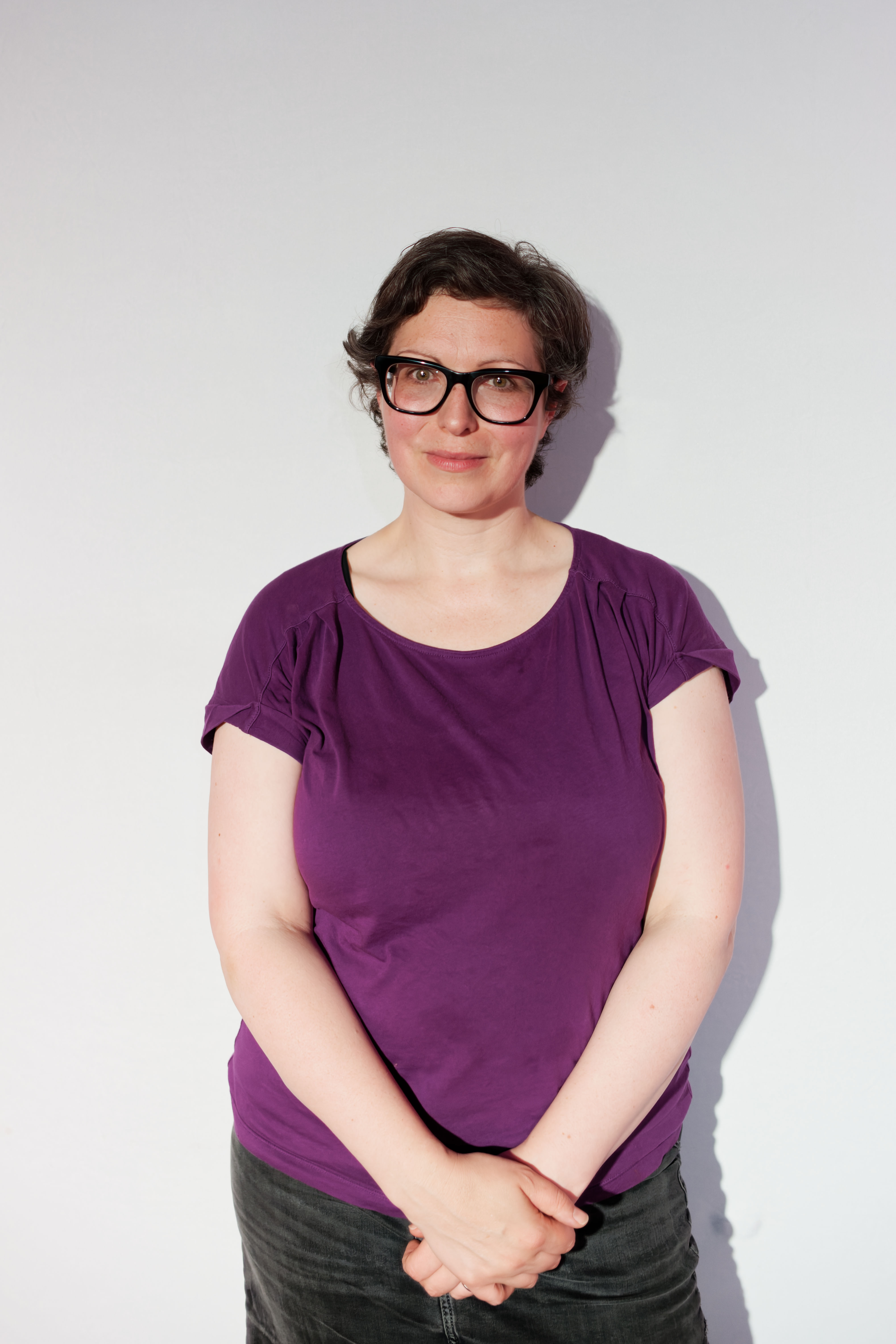
- Arney in 2026
- Education: Imperial College
- Occupation: Physicist
- Helen Arney's voice Recorded November 2015
- Website: helenarney.com

Helen Arney is a British presenter, stand-up comedian and musician. She has toured with the Uncaged Monkeys alongside comedian Robin Ince and Professor Brian Cox.

Described as a "geek songstress" by the Edinburgh Reporter, Arney plays the ukulele as one third of the Festival of the Spoken Nerd, accompanied by stand-up mathematician Matt Parker and television scientist Steve Mould. She and Parker are also commentators on nearly every episode of You Have Been Warned (Outrageous Acts of Science).

After performing songs which she felt were "just quirky and different" at a science show organised by Robin Ince, she realised that she could "add science and music together in a meaningful way".

== Appearances ==
At the 2012 Boring Conference, Arney gave a presentation entitled "Features and Specifications of the Yamaha PSR-175 Portable Keyboard (Discontinued)."

Arney presented a section of an episode of the BBC's natural history series Coast in 2015.

Arney was guest presenter on Episode 97 of No Such Thing as a Fish where she explained the fact that "Tomorrow will be the longest day of your life."

In January 2017 Arney appeared on BBC Radio 4's Museum of Curiosity. Her hypothetical donation to this imaginary museum was a set of samples of the four most recently discovered chemical elements: nihonium, moscovium, tennessine, and oganesson.

She sometimes collaborates with her sister Kat Arney, a science communicator.

== Writing ==
In 2013, Arney wrote a piece in the Financial Times entitled "You've got to laugh", in which she promotes the power of comedy in communicating scientific principles.

In 2018, Arney published the book The element in the room: science-y stuff staring you in the face with her fellow Festival of the Spoken Nerd partner Steve Mould.
