= List of minor planets: 628001–629000 =

The following is a partial list of minor planets, running from minor-planet number 628001 through 629000, inclusive. The primary data for this and other partial lists is based on JPL's "Small-Body Orbital Elements" and data available from the Minor Planet Center. Critical list information is also provided by the MPC, unless otherwise specified from Lowell Observatory. A detailed description of the table's columns and additional sources are given on the main page including a complete list of every page in this series, and a statistical break-up on the dynamical classification of minor planets.

Also see the summary list of all named bodies in numerical and alphabetical order, and the corresponding naming citations for the number range of this particular list. New namings may only be added to this list after official publication, as the preannouncement of names is condemned by the Working Group for Small Bodies Nomenclature of the International Astronomical Union.

Near-Earth obj.	MBA (inner)	MBA (outer)	Centaur
Mars-crosser	MBA (middle)	Jupiter trojan	Trans-Neptunian obj.
Unclassified

== 628001–628100 ==
Designation			Discovery			Properties		Ref
Permanent	Provisional	Named after	Date	Site	Discoverer(s)	Category	Diam.	Ref
628001	2013 EQ_{14}	—	February 14, 2013	Haleakala	Pan-STARRS 1	MAR	800 m	MPC · JPL
628002	2013 EY_{30}	—	March 7, 2013	Kitt Peak	Spacewatch	(194)	1.3 km	MPC · JPL
628003	2013 EO_{99}	—	March 7, 2013	Mount Lemmon	Mount Lemmon Survey	·	1.2 km	MPC · JPL
628004	2013 EM_{109}	—	March 11, 2013	La Silla	La Silla	·	1.5 km	MPC · JPL
628005	2013 EQ_{112}	—	March 13, 2013	Palomar	Palomar Transient Factory	·	1.7 km	MPC · JPL
628006	2013 FF_{30}	—	March 19, 2013	Haleakala	Pan-STARRS 1	·	1.3 km	MPC · JPL
628007	2013 GW_{23}	—	March 4, 2013	Haleakala	Pan-STARRS 1	HNS	960 m	MPC · JPL
628008	2013 GX_{46}	—	September 15, 2006	Kitt Peak	Spacewatch	·	1.3 km	MPC · JPL
628009	2013 GX_{58}	—	March 16, 2013	Kitt Peak	Spacewatch	·	1.2 km	MPC · JPL
628010	2013 GC_{63}	—	February 14, 2004	Palomar	NEAT	·	1.6 km	MPC · JPL
628011	2013 GC_{68}	—	April 10, 2013	Mount Lemmon	Mount Lemmon Survey	ADE	1.9 km	MPC · JPL
628012	2013 HV_{55}	—	April 16, 2013	Cerro Tololo-DECam	DECam	·	1.4 km	MPC · JPL
628013	2013 HE_{112}	—	April 16, 2013	Cerro Tololo-DECam	DECam	·	770 m	MPC · JPL
628014	2013 HP_{125}	—	November 14, 2007	Mount Lemmon	Mount Lemmon Survey	(5)	910 m	MPC · JPL
628015	2013 HW_{138}	—	February 9, 2008	Mount Lemmon	Mount Lemmon Survey	·	1.2 km	MPC · JPL
628016	2013 JE_{25}	—	November 12, 2006	Mount Lemmon	Mount Lemmon Survey	·	1.8 km	MPC · JPL
628017	2013 KV_{6}	—	May 29, 2013	Elena Remote	Oreshko, A.	·	1.5 km	MPC · JPL
628018	2013 NG_{11}	—	October 16, 2007	Mount Lemmon	Mount Lemmon Survey	·	460 m	MPC · JPL
628019	2013 NX_{13}	—	January 18, 2012	Mount Lemmon	Mount Lemmon Survey	·	1.0 km	MPC · JPL
628020	2013 NP_{43}	—	July 15, 2013	Haleakala	Pan-STARRS 1	·	1.6 km	MPC · JPL
628021	2013 NF_{60}	—	October 22, 2009	Mount Lemmon	Mount Lemmon Survey	KOR	1.0 km	MPC · JPL
628022	2013 PR_{1}	—	November 14, 2010	Kitt Peak	Spacewatch	·	480 m	MPC · JPL
628023	2013 PZ_{18}	—	December 31, 2007	Mount Lemmon	Mount Lemmon Survey	·	590 m	MPC · JPL
628024	2013 PU_{50}	—	August 12, 2013	Haleakala	Pan-STARRS 1	·	1.9 km	MPC · JPL
628025	2013 PC_{53}	—	January 10, 2008	Mount Lemmon	Mount Lemmon Survey	·	530 m	MPC · JPL
628026	2013 PV_{55}	—	April 26, 2009	Kitt Peak	Spacewatch	·	580 m	MPC · JPL
628027	2013 PK_{81}	—	August 12, 2013	Haleakala	Pan-STARRS 1	·	1.4 km	MPC · JPL
628028	2013 PA_{111}	—	August 4, 2013	Haleakala	Pan-STARRS 1	·	450 m	MPC · JPL
628029	2013 QN_{6}	—	August 4, 2013	Haleakala	Pan-STARRS 1	GEF	1 km	MPC · JPL
628030	2013 QO_{11}	—	August 14, 2013	Haleakala	Pan-STARRS 1	H	360 m	MPC · JPL
628031	2013 QE_{26}	—	September 19, 1998	Apache Point	SDSS	·	1.4 km	MPC · JPL
628032	2013 QN_{30}	—	September 21, 2007	XuYi	PMO NEO Survey Program	·	840 m	MPC · JPL
628033	2013 QU_{37}	—	October 17, 2010	Mount Lemmon	Mount Lemmon Survey	·	520 m	MPC · JPL
628034	2013 QJ_{53}	—	September 27, 2003	Kitt Peak	Spacewatch	·	470 m	MPC · JPL
628035	2013 QW_{65}	—	September 29, 2003	Kitt Peak	Spacewatch	·	430 m	MPC · JPL
628036	2013 QL_{81}	—	November 10, 2010	Kitt Peak	Spacewatch	·	490 m	MPC · JPL
628037	2013 QG_{89}	—	July 30, 2008	Mount Lemmon	Mount Lemmon Survey	·	1.6 km	MPC · JPL
628038	2013 RH_{46}	—	October 1, 2003	Kitt Peak	Spacewatch	·	1.6 km	MPC · JPL
628039	2013 RC_{50}	—	November 20, 2003	Kitt Peak	Spacewatch	(2076)	490 m	MPC · JPL
628040	2013 RB_{71}	—	December 8, 2010	Mount Lemmon	Mount Lemmon Survey	·	490 m	MPC · JPL
628041	2013 RJ_{76}	—	September 26, 2003	Apache Point	SDSS Collaboration	KOR	1.2 km	MPC · JPL
628042	2013 RU_{77}	—	August 9, 2013	Kitt Peak	Spacewatch	·	1.5 km	MPC · JPL
628043	2013 RB_{129}	—	September 2, 2013	Mount Lemmon	Mount Lemmon Survey	L5	7.2 km	MPC · JPL
628044	2013 RV_{160}	—	April 28, 2006	Cerro Tololo	Deep Ecliptic Survey	·	1.4 km	MPC · JPL
628045	2013 SY_{51}	—	August 21, 2006	Kitt Peak	Spacewatch	·	500 m	MPC · JPL
628046	2013 SV_{53}	—	September 22, 2003	Kitt Peak	Spacewatch	·	500 m	MPC · JPL
628047	2013 SR_{65}	—	March 10, 2005	Mount Lemmon	Mount Lemmon Survey	·	580 m	MPC · JPL
628048	2013 SX_{68}	—	December 3, 2010	Mount Lemmon	Mount Lemmon Survey	·	530 m	MPC · JPL
628049	2013 SZ_{84}	—	October 1, 2008	Mount Lemmon	Mount Lemmon Survey	·	1.9 km	MPC · JPL
628050	2013 SC_{104}	—	September 26, 2013	Mount Lemmon	Mount Lemmon Survey	L5	8.9 km	MPC · JPL
628051	2013 TN_{5}	—	September 21, 2003	Palomar	NEAT	H	290 m	MPC · JPL
628052	2013 TG_{19}	—	October 18, 2003	Palomar	NEAT	·	590 m	MPC · JPL
628053	2013 TP_{34}	—	November 19, 2003	Kitt Peak	Spacewatch	·	450 m	MPC · JPL
628054	2013 TS_{48}	—	September 28, 2013	Haleakala	Pan-STARRS 1	BAP	660 m	MPC · JPL
628055	2013 TW_{53}	—	October 4, 2013	Mount Lemmon	Mount Lemmon Survey	·	1.5 km	MPC · JPL
628056	2013 TE_{59}	—	October 4, 2013	Mount Lemmon	Mount Lemmon Survey	L5	8.6 km	MPC · JPL
628057	2013 TN_{98}	—	October 3, 2013	Haleakala	Pan-STARRS 1	·	610 m	MPC · JPL
628058	2013 TR_{101}	—	October 4, 2006	Mount Lemmon	Mount Lemmon Survey	·	580 m	MPC · JPL
628059	2013 TU_{104}	—	December 1, 1996	Kitt Peak	Spacewatch	BAP	640 m	MPC · JPL
628060	2013 TZ_{109}	—	October 22, 2008	Kitt Peak	Spacewatch	·	1.4 km	MPC · JPL
628061	2013 TM_{111}	—	September 17, 2006	Catalina	CSS	·	830 m	MPC · JPL
628062	2013 TR_{123}	—	January 8, 2005	Campo Imperatore	CINEOS	·	540 m	MPC · JPL
628063	2013 TC_{142}	—	November 19, 2003	Kitt Peak	Spacewatch	·	610 m	MPC · JPL
628064	2013 TY_{156}	—	September 15, 2007	Mount Lemmon	Mount Lemmon Survey	·	2.0 km	MPC · JPL
628065	2013 TT_{159}	—	October 3, 2013	Haleakala	Pan-STARRS 1	L5	7.7 km	MPC · JPL
628066	2013 TB_{197}	—	October 1, 2013	Kitt Peak	Spacewatch	L5	8.0 km	MPC · JPL
628067	2013 TY_{223}	—	October 12, 2013	Mount Lemmon	Mount Lemmon Survey	L5	6.5 km	MPC · JPL
628068	2013 TQ_{235}	—	October 5, 2013	Haleakala	Pan-STARRS 1	EOS	1.4 km	MPC · JPL
628069	2013 UL_{7}	—	September 17, 2006	Kitt Peak	Spacewatch	·	440 m	MPC · JPL
628070	2013 UH_{12}	—	September 6, 2013	Mount Lemmon	Mount Lemmon Survey	·	750 m	MPC · JPL
628071	2013 UM_{20}	—	October 9, 2013	Mount Lemmon	Mount Lemmon Survey	·	1.8 km	MPC · JPL
628072	2013 UE_{23}	—	December 19, 2007	Mount Lemmon	Mount Lemmon Survey	TIR	2.6 km	MPC · JPL
628073	2013 UQ_{28}	—	October 26, 2013	Mount Lemmon	Mount Lemmon Survey	·	2.0 km	MPC · JPL
628074	2013 VL_{10}	—	August 11, 2002	Palomar	NEAT	·	1.4 km	MPC · JPL
628075	2013 VS_{32}	—	October 24, 2014	Mount Lemmon	Mount Lemmon Survey	L5	8.2 km	MPC · JPL
628076	2013 WA_{20}	—	November 27, 2013	Haleakala	Pan-STARRS 1	NYS	670 m	MPC · JPL
628077	2013 WG_{20}	—	October 12, 2006	Palomar	NEAT	·	590 m	MPC · JPL
628078	2013 WO_{38}	—	January 1, 2009	Kitt Peak	Spacewatch	·	1.6 km	MPC · JPL
628079	2013 WR_{48}	—	August 10, 2007	Kitt Peak	Spacewatch	·	1.7 km	MPC · JPL
628080	2013 WC_{59}	—	September 28, 2006	Mount Lemmon	Mount Lemmon Survey	·	540 m	MPC · JPL
628081	2013 WG_{69}	—	September 17, 2006	Kitt Peak	Spacewatch	·	510 m	MPC · JPL
628082	2013 WE_{84}	—	November 2, 2013	Mount Lemmon	Mount Lemmon Survey	·	660 m	MPC · JPL
628083	2013 WM_{85}	—	November 4, 2013	XuYi	PMO NEO Survey Program	·	2.1 km	MPC · JPL
628084	2013 WK_{96}	—	November 17, 2006	Mount Lemmon	Mount Lemmon Survey	NYS	880 m	MPC · JPL
628085	2013 WE_{124}	—	November 27, 2013	Haleakala	Pan-STARRS 1	·	580 m	MPC · JPL
628086	2013 WG_{129}	—	November 29, 2013	Kitt Peak	Spacewatch	·	750 m	MPC · JPL
628087	2013 XR_{36}	—	December 25, 2006	Kitt Peak	Spacewatch	·	760 m	MPC · JPL
628088	2013 YM_{11}	—	August 28, 2006	Kitt Peak	Spacewatch	·	2.7 km	MPC · JPL
628089	2013 YU_{11}	—	December 11, 2006	Kitt Peak	Spacewatch	·	620 m	MPC · JPL
628090	2013 YR_{15}	—	November 27, 2013	Haleakala	Pan-STARRS 1	·	700 m	MPC · JPL
628091	2013 YR_{35}	—	November 8, 2013	Mount Lemmon	Mount Lemmon Survey	THB	2.4 km	MPC · JPL
628092	2013 YM_{61}	—	January 27, 2003	Palomar	NEAT	·	2.8 km	MPC · JPL
628093	2013 YW_{61}	—	November 4, 2007	Mount Lemmon	Mount Lemmon Survey	·	2.1 km	MPC · JPL
628094	2013 YF_{63}	—	November 8, 2013	Mount Lemmon	Mount Lemmon Survey	LIX	2.9 km	MPC · JPL
628095	2013 YG_{72}	—	November 26, 2006	Kitt Peak	Spacewatch	·	600 m	MPC · JPL
628096	2013 YR_{85}	—	October 7, 2012	Haleakala	Pan-STARRS 1	·	2.5 km	MPC · JPL
628097	2013 YZ_{94}	—	December 3, 2002	Palomar	NEAT	·	1.8 km	MPC · JPL
628098	2013 YK_{95}	—	November 9, 2009	Mount Lemmon	Mount Lemmon Survey	·	870 m	MPC · JPL
628099	2013 YW_{97}	—	December 26, 2006	Kitt Peak	Spacewatch	·	740 m	MPC · JPL
628100	2013 YW_{111}	—	January 17, 2007	Kitt Peak	Spacewatch	·	570 m	MPC · JPL

== 628101–628200 ==
back to top

Designation			Discovery			Properties		Ref
Permanent	Provisional	Named after	Date	Site	Discoverer(s)	Category	Diam.	Ref
628101	2013 YG_{117}	—	August 22, 2006	Cerro Tololo	Deep Ecliptic Survey	THM	1.7 km	MPC · JPL
628102	2013 YO_{128}	—	December 11, 2013	Mount Lemmon	Mount Lemmon Survey	V	600 m	MPC · JPL
628103	2013 YJ_{168}	—	December 23, 2013	Mount Lemmon	Mount Lemmon Survey	·	2.3 km	MPC · JPL
628104	2014 AM_{28}	—	February 9, 2003	Palomar	NEAT	·	1.5 km	MPC · JPL
628105	2014 AP_{30}	—	February 22, 2003	Palomar	NEAT	NYS	1.1 km	MPC · JPL
628106	2014 AK_{32}	—	January 6, 2014	Haleakala	Pan-STARRS 1	H	540 m	MPC · JPL
628107	2014 AV_{38}	—	September 15, 2009	Mount Lemmon	Mount Lemmon Survey	·	670 m	MPC · JPL
628108	2014 AF_{45}	—	February 24, 2009	Mount Lemmon	Mount Lemmon Survey	LIX	2.4 km	MPC · JPL
628109	2014 AX_{71}	—	January 11, 2014	Kitt Peak	Spacewatch	·	810 m	MPC · JPL
628110	2014 BW	—	September 4, 2002	Palomar	NEAT	H	470 m	MPC · JPL
628111	2014 BS_{3}	—	January 12, 1996	Kitt Peak	Spacewatch	·	870 m	MPC · JPL
628112	2014 BC_{17}	—	March 12, 2007	Mount Lemmon	Mount Lemmon Survey	·	1.0 km	MPC · JPL
628113	2014 BJ_{22}	—	December 3, 2007	Kitt Peak	Spacewatch	·	2.3 km	MPC · JPL
628114	2014 BN_{26}	—	December 31, 2013	Haleakala	Pan-STARRS 1	V	490 m	MPC · JPL
628115	2014 BH_{30}	—	March 17, 2007	Kitt Peak	Spacewatch	·	940 m	MPC · JPL
628116	2014 BY_{50}	—	November 19, 2007	Mount Lemmon	Mount Lemmon Survey	·	2.3 km	MPC · JPL
628117	2014 BZ_{53}	—	November 17, 2009	Mount Lemmon	Mount Lemmon Survey	·	820 m	MPC · JPL
628118	2014 BE_{55}	—	August 28, 2008	Črni Vrh	Skvarč, J.	·	1.4 km	MPC · JPL
628119	2014 CZ_{9}	—	January 28, 2014	Mount Lemmon	Mount Lemmon Survey	·	910 m	MPC · JPL
628120	2014 CS_{27}	—	February 4, 2003	La Silla	Barbieri, C.	·	730 m	MPC · JPL
628121	2014 DP_{5}	—	February 20, 2014	Mount Lemmon	Mount Lemmon Survey	THB	2.4 km	MPC · JPL
628122	2014 DR_{27}	—	December 30, 2013	Mount Lemmon	Mount Lemmon Survey	·	2.9 km	MPC · JPL
628123	2014 DS_{77}	—	January 13, 1999	Kitt Peak	Spacewatch	·	890 m	MPC · JPL
628124	2014 DQ_{109}	—	February 27, 2014	Mount Lemmon	Mount Lemmon Survey	·	1.2 km	MPC · JPL
628125	2014 DQ_{114}	—	September 18, 2009	Kitt Peak	Spacewatch	·	1.0 km	MPC · JPL
628126	2014 DL_{128}	—	February 9, 2014	Kitt Peak	Spacewatch	·	830 m	MPC · JPL
628127	2014 DM_{155}	—	February 28, 2014	Haleakala	Pan-STARRS 1	·	850 m	MPC · JPL
628128	2014 DN_{155}	—	December 27, 2005	Mount Lemmon	Mount Lemmon Survey	·	1.1 km	MPC · JPL
628129	2014 EC_{232}	—	October 31, 2016	Mount Lemmon	Mount Lemmon Survey	·	960 m	MPC · JPL
628130	2014 FC_{15}	—	March 26, 2003	Palomar	NEAT	NYS	1.0 km	MPC · JPL
628131	2014 FQ_{15}	—	March 10, 2014	Kitt Peak	Spacewatch	·	920 m	MPC · JPL
628132	2014 FZ_{67}	—	April 6, 2014	Mount Lemmon	Mount Lemmon Survey	JUN	830 m	MPC · JPL
628133	2014 GN_{30}	—	October 4, 2002	Palomar	NEAT	·	1.3 km	MPC · JPL
628134	2014 HU_{83}	—	May 11, 2010	Kitt Peak	Spacewatch	·	800 m	MPC · JPL
628135	2014 HV_{126}	—	February 17, 2010	Kitt Peak	Spacewatch	MAS	590 m	MPC · JPL
628136	2014 HA_{129}	—	February 18, 2010	Mount Lemmon	Mount Lemmon Survey	·	1.2 km	MPC · JPL
628137	2014 HE_{143}	—	April 23, 2014	Cerro Tololo-DECam	DECam	3:2	3.7 km	MPC · JPL
628138	2014 HA_{172}	—	April 29, 2014	Haleakala	Pan-STARRS 1	·	800 m	MPC · JPL
628139	2014 HD_{204}	—	April 29, 2014	Haleakala	Pan-STARRS 1	·	760 m	MPC · JPL
628140	2014 JN_{5}	—	April 25, 2014	Kitt Peak	Spacewatch	·	1.0 km	MPC · JPL
628141	2014 JF_{50}	—	May 20, 2010	Mount Lemmon	Mount Lemmon Survey	·	1.1 km	MPC · JPL
628142	2014 JN_{91}	—	May 10, 2014	Haleakala	Pan-STARRS 1	·	960 m	MPC · JPL
628143	2014 KO_{16}	—	May 21, 2014	Mount Lemmon	Mount Lemmon Survey	(5)	900 m	MPC · JPL
628144	2014 KE_{23}	—	January 18, 2013	Kitt Peak	Spacewatch	·	880 m	MPC · JPL
628145	2014 KM_{112}	—	October 13, 2010	Mount Lemmon	Mount Lemmon Survey	·	1.8 km	MPC · JPL
628146	2014 LB	—	April 30, 2014	Haleakala	Pan-STARRS 1	·	1.3 km	MPC · JPL
628147	2014 LW_{13}	—	September 20, 2001	Socorro	LINEAR	·	1.1 km	MPC · JPL
628148	2014 LL_{29}	—	October 30, 2010	Kitt Peak	Spacewatch	·	1.2 km	MPC · JPL
628149	2014 LK_{31}	—	June 3, 2014	Haleakala	Pan-STARRS 1	·	1.6 km	MPC · JPL
628150	2014 LR_{32}	—	September 20, 2001	Apache Point	SDSS Collaboration	·	1.5 km	MPC · JPL
628151	2014 LD_{33}	—	June 4, 2014	Haleakala	Pan-STARRS 1	·	1.1 km	MPC · JPL
628152	2014 MC_{30}	—	June 23, 2014	Mount Lemmon	Mount Lemmon Survey	·	1.0 km	MPC · JPL
628153	2014 MS_{74}	—	October 28, 2010	Mount Lemmon	Mount Lemmon Survey	·	1.6 km	MPC · JPL
628154	2014 MA_{78}	—	November 28, 2010	Mount Lemmon	Mount Lemmon Survey	526	1.5 km	MPC · JPL
628155	2014 NE_{14}	—	October 13, 2006	Kitt Peak	Spacewatch	·	1.3 km	MPC · JPL
628156	2014 NG_{25}	—	July 2, 2014	Haleakala	Pan-STARRS 1	·	1.3 km	MPC · JPL
628157	2014 NW_{27}	—	August 26, 2001	Kitt Peak	Spacewatch	·	1.1 km	MPC · JPL
628158	2014 NP_{67}	—	November 3, 2010	Mount Lemmon	Mount Lemmon Survey	AEO	950 m	MPC · JPL
628159	2014 NY_{67}	—	July 7, 2014	Haleakala	Pan-STARRS 1	·	1.3 km	MPC · JPL
628160	2014 NW_{68}	—	September 23, 2001	Kitt Peak	Spacewatch	·	1.1 km	MPC · JPL
628161	2014 NH_{76}	—	June 8, 2005	Kitt Peak	Spacewatch	·	1.3 km	MPC · JPL
628162	2014 NO_{80}	—	July 1, 2014	Haleakala	Pan-STARRS 1	·	900 m	MPC · JPL
628163	2014 OZ_{4}	—	November 4, 2010	Palomar	Palomar Transient Factory	·	1.1 km	MPC · JPL
628164	2014 OS_{56}	—	April 20, 2009	Kitt Peak	Spacewatch	·	1.2 km	MPC · JPL
628165	2014 OF_{57}	—	September 30, 2006	Mount Lemmon	Mount Lemmon Survey	·	1.5 km	MPC · JPL
628166	2014 OC_{79}	—	November 17, 2006	Mount Lemmon	Mount Lemmon Survey	·	1.3 km	MPC · JPL
628167	2014 OT_{90}	—	October 20, 2006	Kitt Peak	Spacewatch	·	1.0 km	MPC · JPL
628168	2014 OT_{94}	—	July 26, 2014	Haleakala	Pan-STARRS 1	·	1.6 km	MPC · JPL
628169	2014 OF_{123}	—	January 27, 2012	Mount Lemmon	Mount Lemmon Survey	·	1.1 km	MPC · JPL
628170	2014 OC_{124}	—	October 20, 2006	Kitt Peak	Spacewatch	·	1.0 km	MPC · JPL
628171	2014 OY_{128}	—	July 25, 2014	Haleakala	Pan-STARRS 1	HOF	2.1 km	MPC · JPL
628172	2014 OG_{136}	—	January 10, 2008	Mount Lemmon	Mount Lemmon Survey	·	1.3 km	MPC · JPL
628173	2014 OJ_{142}	—	June 27, 2014	Haleakala	Pan-STARRS 1	·	1.3 km	MPC · JPL
628174	2014 OY_{151}	—	July 21, 2006	Lulin	LUSS	·	1.6 km	MPC · JPL
628175	2014 ON_{158}	—	September 30, 2010	Mount Lemmon	Mount Lemmon Survey	·	1.3 km	MPC · JPL
628176	2014 OT_{160}	—	January 3, 2012	Kitt Peak	Spacewatch	·	1.5 km	MPC · JPL
628177	2014 OV_{161}	—	September 19, 2001	Kitt Peak	Spacewatch	·	1.3 km	MPC · JPL
628178	2014 OL_{175}	—	January 26, 2012	Haleakala	Pan-STARRS 1	·	1.3 km	MPC · JPL
628179	2014 OL_{196}	—	January 19, 2012	Kitt Peak	Spacewatch	·	2.0 km	MPC · JPL
628180	2014 OW_{196}	—	October 25, 2005	Catalina	CSS	DOR	2.1 km	MPC · JPL
628181	2014 OO_{219}	—	June 27, 2014	Haleakala	Pan-STARRS 1	·	1.1 km	MPC · JPL
628182	2014 OW_{262}	—	May 8, 2013	Haleakala	Pan-STARRS 1	·	1.5 km	MPC · JPL
628183	2014 OC_{265}	—	September 11, 2010	La Sagra	OAM	JUN	760 m	MPC · JPL
628184	2014 OV_{305}	—	July 25, 2014	Haleakala	Pan-STARRS 1	·	1.1 km	MPC · JPL
628185	2014 OH_{311}	—	September 6, 2010	Piszkés-tető	K. Sárneczky, Z. Kuli	·	1.5 km	MPC · JPL
628186	2014 OB_{313}	—	March 10, 2005	Anderson Mesa	LONEOS	·	1.1 km	MPC · JPL
628187	2014 OO_{315}	—	September 1, 2005	Kitt Peak	Spacewatch	·	1.4 km	MPC · JPL
628188	2014 OY_{318}	—	September 11, 2010	Mount Lemmon	Mount Lemmon Survey	·	980 m	MPC · JPL
628189	2014 OH_{332}	—	July 29, 2014	Haleakala	Pan-STARRS 1	(5)	800 m	MPC · JPL
628190	2014 OS_{339}	—	September 3, 2010	Mount Lemmon	Mount Lemmon Survey	·	1.4 km	MPC · JPL
628191	2014 OA_{340}	—	July 25, 2014	Haleakala	Pan-STARRS 1	·	1.2 km	MPC · JPL
628192	2014 OH_{343}	—	July 30, 2014	Haleakala	Pan-STARRS 1	HNS	760 m	MPC · JPL
628193	2014 OT_{363}	—	March 5, 2013	Haleakala	Pan-STARRS 1	·	1.4 km	MPC · JPL
628194	2014 OL_{384}	—	September 3, 2010	Mount Lemmon	Mount Lemmon Survey	EUN	980 m	MPC · JPL
628195	2014 OM_{389}	—	March 10, 2005	Catalina	CSS	·	1.1 km	MPC · JPL
628196	2014 OJ_{399}	—	April 16, 2013	Cerro Tololo-DECam	DECam	·	1.2 km	MPC · JPL
628197	2014 OK_{401}	—	June 25, 2014	Mount Lemmon	Mount Lemmon Survey	·	1.3 km	MPC · JPL
628198	2014 OQ_{401}	—	July 25, 2014	Haleakala	Pan-STARRS 1	·	1.3 km	MPC · JPL
628199	2014 OU_{411}	—	March 31, 2013	Mount Lemmon	Mount Lemmon Survey	AEO	860 m	MPC · JPL
628200	2014 OZ_{411}	—	July 28, 2014	Haleakala	Pan-STARRS 1	·	1.5 km	MPC · JPL

== 628201–628300 ==
back to top

Designation			Discovery			Properties		Ref
Permanent	Provisional	Named after	Date	Site	Discoverer(s)	Category	Diam.	Ref
628201	2014 OB_{412}	—	November 14, 2010	Mount Lemmon	Mount Lemmon Survey	·	1.4 km	MPC · JPL
628202	2014 PE_{1}	—	July 3, 2014	Haleakala	Pan-STARRS 1	·	1.4 km	MPC · JPL
628203	2014 PB_{5}	—	October 8, 2010	Kitt Peak	Spacewatch	·	1.4 km	MPC · JPL
628204	2014 PR_{6}	—	May 31, 2014	Haleakala	Pan-STARRS 1	EUN	840 m	MPC · JPL
628205	2014 PH_{11}	—	August 30, 2005	Kitt Peak	Spacewatch	·	1.2 km	MPC · JPL
628206	2014 PG_{20}	—	October 17, 2010	Mount Lemmon	Mount Lemmon Survey	·	1.1 km	MPC · JPL
628207	2014 PW_{34}	—	November 13, 2010	Mount Lemmon	Mount Lemmon Survey	AEO	800 m	MPC · JPL
628208	2014 PR_{45}	—	October 29, 2010	Piszkés-tető	K. Sárneczky, S. Kürti	·	1.1 km	MPC · JPL
628209	2014 PY_{51}	—	November 26, 2010	Mount Lemmon	Mount Lemmon Survey	·	1.5 km	MPC · JPL
628210	2014 PQ_{68}	—	June 29, 2014	Haleakala	Pan-STARRS 1	·	1.3 km	MPC · JPL
628211	2014 PB_{73}	—	September 29, 2005	Kitt Peak	Spacewatch	HOF	1.7 km	MPC · JPL
628212	2014 PD_{74}	—	November 5, 2010	Mount Lemmon	Mount Lemmon Survey	·	1.5 km	MPC · JPL
628213	2014 QV_{5}	—	September 20, 2001	Kitt Peak	Spacewatch	·	1.1 km	MPC · JPL
628214	2014 QG_{20}	—	January 13, 2011	Kitt Peak	Spacewatch	·	1.3 km	MPC · JPL
628215	2014 QN_{29}	—	September 10, 2005	Anderson Mesa	LONEOS	·	1.6 km	MPC · JPL
628216	2014 QP_{58}	—	October 20, 2006	Mount Lemmon	Mount Lemmon Survey	·	1.0 km	MPC · JPL
628217	2014 QD_{65}	—	March 8, 2013	Haleakala	Pan-STARRS 1	·	1.3 km	MPC · JPL
628218	2014 QQ_{92}	—	December 27, 2011	Mount Lemmon	Mount Lemmon Survey	MAR	1.2 km	MPC · JPL
628219	2014 QA_{110}	—	November 17, 2010	Kitt Peak	Spacewatch	·	1.2 km	MPC · JPL
628220	2014 QL_{114}	—	January 26, 2012	Mount Lemmon	Mount Lemmon Survey	·	1.5 km	MPC · JPL
628221	2014 QH_{119}	—	January 19, 2012	Haleakala	Pan-STARRS 1	(12739)	1.3 km	MPC · JPL
628222	2014 QE_{129}	—	October 14, 2010	Mount Lemmon	Mount Lemmon Survey	·	1.3 km	MPC · JPL
628223	2014 QG_{129}	—	November 11, 2010	Mount Lemmon	Mount Lemmon Survey	·	1.3 km	MPC · JPL
628224	2014 QW_{145}	—	December 27, 2006	Mount Lemmon	Mount Lemmon Survey	HOF	2.1 km	MPC · JPL
628225	2014 QG_{150}	—	October 7, 2005	Kitt Peak	Spacewatch	·	1.6 km	MPC · JPL
628226	2014 QJ_{176}	—	November 13, 2010	Mount Lemmon	Mount Lemmon Survey	·	1.3 km	MPC · JPL
628227	2014 QV_{192}	—	September 16, 2010	Mount Lemmon	Mount Lemmon Survey	·	1.4 km	MPC · JPL
628228	2014 QJ_{197}	—	October 31, 2010	Mount Lemmon	Mount Lemmon Survey	PAD	1.3 km	MPC · JPL
628229	2014 QN_{205}	—	August 31, 2005	Kitt Peak	Spacewatch	·	1.4 km	MPC · JPL
628230	2014 QJ_{213}	—	November 12, 2010	Mount Lemmon	Mount Lemmon Survey	·	1.3 km	MPC · JPL
628231	2014 QR_{217}	—	February 25, 2012	Mount Lemmon	Mount Lemmon Survey	·	1.4 km	MPC · JPL
628232	2014 QW_{228}	—	August 28, 2005	Kitt Peak	Spacewatch	·	1.4 km	MPC · JPL
628233	2014 QF_{234}	—	November 14, 2010	Kitt Peak	Spacewatch	·	1.4 km	MPC · JPL
628234	2014 QB_{239}	—	November 8, 2010	Kitt Peak	Spacewatch	·	1.3 km	MPC · JPL
628235	2014 QA_{248}	—	November 1, 2005	Mount Lemmon	Mount Lemmon Survey	·	1.5 km	MPC · JPL
628236	2014 QU_{248}	—	October 28, 2010	Mount Lemmon	Mount Lemmon Survey	·	1.3 km	MPC · JPL
628237	2014 QZ_{248}	—	March 30, 2008	Kitt Peak	Spacewatch	·	2.1 km	MPC · JPL
628238	2014 QP_{249}	—	October 17, 2010	Mount Lemmon	Mount Lemmon Survey	·	1.6 km	MPC · JPL
628239	2014 QF_{278}	—	February 6, 2007	Mount Lemmon	Mount Lemmon Survey	·	1.2 km	MPC · JPL
628240	2014 QS_{281}	—	August 24, 2014	Piszkéstető	K. Sárneczky	·	1.5 km	MPC · JPL
628241	2014 QG_{298}	—	July 25, 2014	Haleakala	Pan-STARRS 1	EUN	970 m	MPC · JPL
628242	2014 QG_{312}	—	January 20, 2012	Kitt Peak	Spacewatch	·	1.4 km	MPC · JPL
628243	2014 QF_{314}	—	August 25, 2014	Haleakala	Pan-STARRS 1	·	1.2 km	MPC · JPL
628244	2014 QF_{349}	—	October 17, 2010	Mount Lemmon	Mount Lemmon Survey	·	1.4 km	MPC · JPL
628245	2014 QT_{351}	—	July 31, 2014	Haleakala	Pan-STARRS 1	·	1.5 km	MPC · JPL
628246	2014 QV_{352}	—	October 4, 2005	Mount Lemmon	Mount Lemmon Survey	·	1.4 km	MPC · JPL
628247	2014 QQ_{357}	—	October 29, 2005	Kitt Peak	Spacewatch	·	1.1 km	MPC · JPL
628248	2014 QJ_{372}	—	November 6, 2010	Mount Lemmon	Mount Lemmon Survey	AGN	1.1 km	MPC · JPL
628249	2014 QZ_{385}	—	January 2, 2011	Mount Lemmon	Mount Lemmon Survey	·	1.4 km	MPC · JPL
628250	2014 QL_{390}	—	August 28, 2014	Haleakala	Pan-STARRS 1	AMO	130 m	MPC · JPL
628251	2014 QN_{392}	—	July 28, 2014	Haleakala	Pan-STARRS 1	·	1.2 km	MPC · JPL
628252	2014 QA_{398}	—	August 27, 2014	Haleakala	Pan-STARRS 1	·	1.5 km	MPC · JPL
628253	2014 QT_{411}	—	November 14, 2010	Kitt Peak	Spacewatch	·	1.0 km	MPC · JPL
628254	2014 QU_{421}	—	October 11, 2010	Mount Lemmon	Mount Lemmon Survey	·	1.5 km	MPC · JPL
628255	2014 QQ_{444}	—	March 13, 2012	Mount Lemmon	Mount Lemmon Survey	·	1.5 km	MPC · JPL
628256	2014 QY_{451}	—	April 4, 2008	Mount Lemmon	Mount Lemmon Survey	·	1.4 km	MPC · JPL
628257	2014 QX_{455}	—	March 4, 2008	Kitt Peak	Spacewatch	·	1.5 km	MPC · JPL
628258	2014 QO_{458}	—	August 18, 2014	Haleakala	Pan-STARRS 1	·	1.3 km	MPC · JPL
628259	2014 QB_{460}	—	August 20, 2014	Haleakala	Pan-STARRS 1	·	1.3 km	MPC · JPL
628260	2014 QU_{467}	—	February 25, 2007	Kitt Peak	Spacewatch	·	1.4 km	MPC · JPL
628261	2014 QL_{470}	—	August 30, 2005	Kitt Peak	Spacewatch	·	1.5 km	MPC · JPL
628262	2014 QC_{473}	—	October 3, 2005	Kitt Peak	Spacewatch	AGN	980 m	MPC · JPL
628263	2014 QQ_{480}	—	September 30, 2005	Mount Lemmon	Mount Lemmon Survey	·	1.3 km	MPC · JPL
628264	2014 QZ_{480}	—	October 29, 2010	Mount Lemmon	Mount Lemmon Survey	·	1.3 km	MPC · JPL
628265	2014 QV_{521}	—	August 20, 2014	Haleakala	Pan-STARRS 1	·	1.2 km	MPC · JPL
628266	2014 RR_{8}	—	January 19, 2007	Mauna Kea	P. A. Wiegert	·	1.4 km	MPC · JPL
628267	2014 RZ_{13}	—	September 1, 2014	Mount Lemmon	Mount Lemmon Survey	·	1.5 km	MPC · JPL
628268	2014 RL_{16}	—	July 30, 2005	Campo Imperatore	CINEOS	·	1.7 km	MPC · JPL
628269	2014 RA_{44}	—	July 31, 2005	Palomar	NEAT	·	1.9 km	MPC · JPL
628270	2014 RL_{56}	—	October 24, 2005	Kitt Peak	Spacewatch	·	2.2 km	MPC · JPL
628271	2014 SX_{2}	—	September 1, 2005	Kitt Peak	Spacewatch	·	1.3 km	MPC · JPL
628272	2014 SZ_{5}	—	August 20, 2014	Haleakala	Pan-STARRS 1	·	1.4 km	MPC · JPL
628273	2014 SD_{9}	—	October 1, 2005	Catalina	CSS	·	1.3 km	MPC · JPL
628274	2014 SK_{9}	—	August 28, 2005	Kitt Peak	Spacewatch	WIT	810 m	MPC · JPL
628275	2014 SX_{10}	—	January 29, 2012	Mount Lemmon	Mount Lemmon Survey	·	1.6 km	MPC · JPL
628276	2014 SN_{14}	—	August 20, 2014	Haleakala	Pan-STARRS 1	AST	1.4 km	MPC · JPL
628277	2014 SF_{21}	—	December 2, 2010	Mount Lemmon	Mount Lemmon Survey	·	1.2 km	MPC · JPL
628278	2014 SV_{28}	—	March 30, 2008	Kitt Peak	Spacewatch	·	1.8 km	MPC · JPL
628279	2014 SQ_{30}	—	July 7, 2014	Haleakala	Pan-STARRS 1	AEO	1.1 km	MPC · JPL
628280	2014 SL_{42}	—	April 1, 2008	Mount Lemmon	Mount Lemmon Survey	·	1.6 km	MPC · JPL
628281	2014 SR_{49}	—	August 28, 2014	Haleakala	Pan-STARRS 1	·	1.5 km	MPC · JPL
628282	2014 SV_{51}	—	November 1, 2010	Mount Lemmon	Mount Lemmon Survey	·	1.2 km	MPC · JPL
628283	2014 SQ_{54}	—	August 28, 2014	Haleakala	Pan-STARRS 1	·	1.6 km	MPC · JPL
628284	2014 SH_{60}	—	April 15, 2013	Haleakala	Pan-STARRS 1	WIT	790 m	MPC · JPL
628285	2014 SL_{61}	—	November 10, 2010	Mount Lemmon	Mount Lemmon Survey	·	1.6 km	MPC · JPL
628286	2014 SW_{63}	—	November 17, 2006	Kitt Peak	Spacewatch	·	1.3 km	MPC · JPL
628287	2014 SU_{67}	—	July 30, 2014	Haleakala	Pan-STARRS 1	PAD	1.4 km	MPC · JPL
628288	2014 SQ_{89}	—	February 8, 2011	Mount Lemmon	Mount Lemmon Survey	·	1.3 km	MPC · JPL
628289	2014 SG_{92}	—	July 30, 2014	Haleakala	Pan-STARRS 1	AGN	980 m	MPC · JPL
628290	2014 SR_{102}	—	September 18, 2014	Haleakala	Pan-STARRS 1	·	1.2 km	MPC · JPL
628291	2014 SS_{111}	—	August 31, 2005	Kitt Peak	Spacewatch	·	1.7 km	MPC · JPL
628292	2014 SA_{124}	—	October 30, 2005	Kitt Peak	Spacewatch	·	1.3 km	MPC · JPL
628293	2014 SE_{124}	—	March 17, 2012	Mount Lemmon	Mount Lemmon Survey	·	1.4 km	MPC · JPL
628294	2014 SD_{133}	—	November 27, 2010	Mount Lemmon	Mount Lemmon Survey	·	1.3 km	MPC · JPL
628295	2014 ST_{133}	—	October 1, 2005	Anderson Mesa	LONEOS	·	1.6 km	MPC · JPL
628296	2014 SD_{149}	—	August 27, 2005	Palomar	NEAT	·	1.6 km	MPC · JPL
628297	2014 SN_{171}	—	September 11, 2010	Mount Lemmon	Mount Lemmon Survey	·	1.4 km	MPC · JPL
628298	2014 SM_{179}	—	August 28, 2014	Kitt Peak	Spacewatch	·	1.3 km	MPC · JPL
628299	2014 SZ_{184}	—	July 31, 2014	Haleakala	Pan-STARRS 1	·	1.5 km	MPC · JPL
628300	2014 SA_{185}	—	June 5, 2013	Mount Lemmon	Mount Lemmon Survey	WIT	820 m	MPC · JPL

== 628301–628400 ==
back to top

Designation			Discovery			Properties		Ref
Permanent	Provisional	Named after	Date	Site	Discoverer(s)	Category	Diam.	Ref
628301	2014 SW_{211}	—	June 18, 2013	Haleakala	Pan-STARRS 1	·	1.6 km	MPC · JPL
628302	2014 SJ_{226}	—	September 18, 2014	Haleakala	Pan-STARRS 1	·	1.2 km	MPC · JPL
628303	2014 SU_{233}	—	August 25, 2014	Haleakala	Pan-STARRS 1	·	1.4 km	MPC · JPL
628304	2014 SC_{236}	—	September 27, 2005	Kitt Peak	Spacewatch	PAD	1.4 km	MPC · JPL
628305	2014 SQ_{244}	—	December 11, 2010	Mount Lemmon	Mount Lemmon Survey	DOR	1.5 km	MPC · JPL
628306	2014 SK_{255}	—	October 30, 2005	Kitt Peak	Spacewatch	HOF	2.1 km	MPC · JPL
628307	2014 SA_{276}	—	February 28, 2012	Haleakala	Pan-STARRS 1	BRA	1.2 km	MPC · JPL
628308	2014 SE_{301}	—	June 7, 2013	Haleakala	Pan-STARRS 1	·	1.7 km	MPC · JPL
628309	2014 SJ_{353}	—	September 18, 1995	Kitt Peak	Spacewatch	·	1.4 km	MPC · JPL
628310	2014 SS_{355}	—	August 29, 2009	Kitt Peak	Spacewatch	·	1.5 km	MPC · JPL
628311	2014 SC_{362}	—	September 21, 2009	Mount Lemmon	Mount Lemmon Survey	AGN	930 m	MPC · JPL
628312	2014 SL_{383}	—	September 18, 2014	Haleakala	Pan-STARRS 1	·	1.3 km	MPC · JPL
628313	2014 SX_{395}	—	September 20, 2014	Haleakala	Pan-STARRS 1	L5	7.3 km	MPC · JPL
628314	2014 TX_{11}	—	October 1, 2014	Haleakala	Pan-STARRS 1	·	1.3 km	MPC · JPL
628315	2014 TR_{13}	—	February 21, 2012	Kitt Peak	Spacewatch	·	1.7 km	MPC · JPL
628316	2014 TQ_{21}	—	December 13, 2010	Mount Lemmon	Mount Lemmon Survey	KOR	970 m	MPC · JPL
628317	2014 TN_{29}	—	September 16, 2004	Kitt Peak	Spacewatch	KOR	1.1 km	MPC · JPL
628318 Stevemould	2014 TB_{76}	Stevemould	September 30, 2014	Kitt Peak	Spacewatch	·	1.6 km	MPC · JPL
628319	2014 TW_{89}	—	March 17, 2012	Kitt Peak	Spacewatch	·	1.7 km	MPC · JPL
628320	2014 UM_{14}	—	October 28, 2005	Kitt Peak	Spacewatch	·	1.4 km	MPC · JPL
628321	2014 UH_{55}	—	September 25, 2014	Kitt Peak	Spacewatch	·	1.4 km	MPC · JPL
628322	2014 UC_{73}	—	January 3, 2011	Mount Lemmon	Mount Lemmon Survey	·	1.4 km	MPC · JPL
628323	2014 UH_{80}	—	April 11, 1994	Kitt Peak	Spacewatch	·	1.9 km	MPC · JPL
628324	2014 UN_{130}	—	October 30, 2005	Mount Lemmon	Mount Lemmon Survey	AGN	1.0 km	MPC · JPL
628325	2014 UM_{136}	—	November 15, 1998	Kitt Peak	Spacewatch	·	1.9 km	MPC · JPL
628326	2014 UG_{142}	—	September 17, 1995	Kitt Peak	Spacewatch	HOF	1.8 km	MPC · JPL
628327	2014 UV_{146}	—	September 19, 2009	Kitt Peak	Spacewatch	·	1.3 km	MPC · JPL
628328	2014 UE_{168}	—	December 24, 2005	Kitt Peak	Spacewatch	·	1.6 km	MPC · JPL
628329	2014 UR_{185}	—	August 30, 2014	Haleakala	Pan-STARRS 1	·	1.6 km	MPC · JPL
628330	2014 UX_{188}	—	November 11, 2001	Kitt Peak	Spacewatch	·	1.0 km	MPC · JPL
628331	2014 UG_{189}	—	November 26, 2005	Mount Lemmon	Mount Lemmon Survey	(32418)	1.7 km	MPC · JPL
628332	2014 UP_{193}	—	November 25, 2005	Mount Lemmon	Mount Lemmon Survey	·	1.7 km	MPC · JPL
628333	2014 US_{193}	—	October 30, 2005	Kitt Peak	Spacewatch	HOF	2.0 km	MPC · JPL
628334	2014 UK_{194}	—	October 28, 2005	Kitt Peak	Spacewatch	·	1.6 km	MPC · JPL
628335	2014 UU_{209}	—	October 29, 2014	Calar Alto	S. Hellmich, S. Mottola	L5	6.0 km	MPC · JPL
628336	2014 UV_{223}	—	January 30, 2011	Mount Lemmon	Mount Lemmon Survey	·	1.5 km	MPC · JPL
628337	2014 UA_{255}	—	October 25, 2014	Kitt Peak	Spacewatch	KOR	1.1 km	MPC · JPL
628338	2014 UV_{261}	—	October 26, 2014	Mount Lemmon	Mount Lemmon Survey	HOF	1.8 km	MPC · JPL
628339	2014 VO_{21}	—	October 31, 1999	Kitt Peak	Spacewatch	KOR	1.1 km	MPC · JPL
628340	2014 WK_{11}	—	January 26, 2003	Kitt Peak	Spacewatch	·	970 m	MPC · JPL
628341	2014 WA_{15}	—	September 19, 2009	Kitt Peak	Spacewatch	·	2.0 km	MPC · JPL
628342	2014 WC_{72}	—	September 29, 2009	Mount Lemmon	Mount Lemmon Survey	615	990 m	MPC · JPL
628343	2014 WN_{74}	—	October 23, 2009	Mount Lemmon	Mount Lemmon Survey	KOR	910 m	MPC · JPL
628344	2014 WP_{83}	—	January 27, 2011	Mount Lemmon	Mount Lemmon Survey	KOR	1.1 km	MPC · JPL
628345	2014 WR_{85}	—	September 28, 2009	Kitt Peak	Spacewatch	KOR	990 m	MPC · JPL
628346	2014 WX_{87}	—	November 16, 2009	Mount Lemmon	Mount Lemmon Survey	KOR	1.0 km	MPC · JPL
628347	2014 WZ_{102}	—	September 19, 2009	Kitt Peak	Spacewatch	·	1.4 km	MPC · JPL
628348	2014 WR_{105}	—	January 14, 2011	Mount Lemmon	Mount Lemmon Survey	·	1.7 km	MPC · JPL
628349	2014 WY_{115}	—	September 23, 2009	Kitt Peak	Spacewatch	·	1.4 km	MPC · JPL
628350	2014 WN_{123}	—	December 25, 2005	Kitt Peak	Spacewatch	·	1.6 km	MPC · JPL
628351	2014 WG_{128}	—	October 25, 2005	Catalina	CSS	·	1.6 km	MPC · JPL
628352	2014 WB_{133}	—	October 8, 2004	Kitt Peak	Spacewatch	KOR	1.1 km	MPC · JPL
628353	2014 WE_{142}	—	March 3, 2009	Kitt Peak	Spacewatch	·	450 m	MPC · JPL
628354	2014 WA_{145}	—	November 17, 2014	Haleakala	Pan-STARRS 1	·	1.7 km	MPC · JPL
628355	2014 WN_{175}	—	September 19, 2014	Haleakala	Pan-STARRS 1	AGN	910 m	MPC · JPL
628356	2014 WP_{186}	—	April 20, 2012	Mount Lemmon	Mount Lemmon Survey	·	1.6 km	MPC · JPL
628357	2014 WX_{197}	—	September 20, 2014	Haleakala	Pan-STARRS 1	·	1.4 km	MPC · JPL
628358	2014 WE_{207}	—	November 17, 2014	Mount Lemmon	Mount Lemmon Survey	KOR	1.1 km	MPC · JPL
628359	2014 WT_{207}	—	October 9, 2004	Kitt Peak	Spacewatch	KOR	1.1 km	MPC · JPL
628360	2014 WT_{244}	—	August 27, 2014	Haleakala	Pan-STARRS 1	·	1.4 km	MPC · JPL
628361	2014 WT_{301}	—	October 10, 2005	Catalina	CSS	·	2.0 km	MPC · JPL
628362	2014 WJ_{319}	—	August 23, 2014	Haleakala	Pan-STARRS 1	JUN	930 m	MPC · JPL
628363	2014 WB_{342}	—	March 14, 2012	Haleakala	Pan-STARRS 1	·	2.3 km	MPC · JPL
628364	2014 WM_{386}	—	November 21, 2014	Haleakala	Pan-STARRS 1	L5	6.8 km	MPC · JPL
628365	2014 WJ_{394}	—	January 17, 2007	Kitt Peak	Spacewatch	·	2.7 km	MPC · JPL
628366	2014 WU_{406}	—	November 26, 2014	Haleakala	Pan-STARRS 1	·	2.3 km	MPC · JPL
628367	2014 WS_{440}	—	July 29, 2008	Mount Lemmon	Mount Lemmon Survey	·	2.1 km	MPC · JPL
628368	2014 WO_{487}	—	October 8, 2007	Mount Lemmon	Mount Lemmon Survey	TIR	2.1 km	MPC · JPL
628369	2014 WF_{491}	—	October 23, 2003	Apache Point	SDSS Collaboration	·	2.0 km	MPC · JPL
628370	2014 WS_{519}	—	November 26, 2014	Haleakala	Pan-STARRS 1	TIR	2.2 km	MPC · JPL
628371	2014 WC_{521}	—	November 9, 2009	Mount Lemmon	Mount Lemmon Survey	·	1.5 km	MPC · JPL
628372	2014 WR_{530}	—	November 26, 2014	Haleakala	Pan-STARRS 1	·	1.0 km	MPC · JPL
628373	2014 WV_{548}	—	December 7, 2015	Haleakala	Pan-STARRS 1	·	1.5 km	MPC · JPL
628374	2014 WU_{575}	—	November 17, 2014	Haleakala	Pan-STARRS 1	·	2.3 km	MPC · JPL
628375	2014 YN_{18}	—	January 31, 2009	Mount Lemmon	Mount Lemmon Survey	·	520 m	MPC · JPL
628376	2014 YW_{74}	—	December 29, 2014	Haleakala	Pan-STARRS 1	·	440 m	MPC · JPL
628377	2014 YU_{80}	—	December 29, 2014	Haleakala	Pan-STARRS 1	·	2.4 km	MPC · JPL
628378	2015 AZ_{23}	—	May 12, 2011	Mount Lemmon	Mount Lemmon Survey	·	2.9 km	MPC · JPL
628379	2015 AL_{27}	—	November 20, 2008	Kitt Peak	Spacewatch	·	2.2 km	MPC · JPL
628380	2015 AG_{46}	—	September 21, 2012	Mount Lemmon	Mount Lemmon Survey	L5	7.8 km	MPC · JPL
628381	2015 AL_{50}	—	August 6, 2007	Lulin	LUSS	·	660 m	MPC · JPL
628382	2015 AN_{155}	—	October 1, 2008	Kitt Peak	Spacewatch	·	1.5 km	MPC · JPL
628383	2015 AM_{183}	—	January 14, 2015	Haleakala	Pan-STARRS 1	·	1.3 km	MPC · JPL
628384	2015 AL_{184}	—	September 4, 2008	Kitt Peak	Spacewatch	·	1.2 km	MPC · JPL
628385	2015 AS_{186}	—	January 14, 2015	Haleakala	Pan-STARRS 1	·	2.4 km	MPC · JPL
628386	2015 AZ_{202}	—	October 8, 2007	Kitt Peak	Spacewatch	·	540 m	MPC · JPL
628387	2015 AD_{231}	—	April 18, 2009	Mount Lemmon	Mount Lemmon Survey	·	700 m	MPC · JPL
628388	2015 AZ_{231}	—	January 12, 2010	Kitt Peak	Spacewatch	·	1.8 km	MPC · JPL
628389	2015 AO_{232}	—	November 30, 2008	Mount Lemmon	Mount Lemmon Survey	·	1.4 km	MPC · JPL
628390	2015 AA_{235}	—	September 24, 2012	Mount Lemmon	Mount Lemmon Survey	·	2.8 km	MPC · JPL
628391	2015 AW_{240}	—	June 4, 2006	Mount Lemmon	Mount Lemmon Survey	·	3.0 km	MPC · JPL
628392	2015 AT_{262}	—	September 10, 2007	Mount Lemmon	Mount Lemmon Survey	·	2.3 km	MPC · JPL
628393	2015 BQ_{2}	—	September 9, 2007	Kitt Peak	Spacewatch	·	540 m	MPC · JPL
628394	2015 BJ_{25}	—	November 5, 2007	Kitt Peak	Spacewatch	·	530 m	MPC · JPL
628395	2015 BG_{55}	—	June 18, 2013	Haleakala	Pan-STARRS 1	·	510 m	MPC · JPL
628396	2015 BZ_{67}	—	January 17, 2015	Haleakala	Pan-STARRS 1	·	430 m	MPC · JPL
628397	2015 BM_{76}	—	November 18, 2008	Kitt Peak	Spacewatch	·	1.9 km	MPC · JPL
628398	2015 BX_{76}	—	October 1, 2003	Kitt Peak	Spacewatch	·	1.1 km	MPC · JPL
628399	2015 BW_{91}	—	December 20, 2014	Haleakala	Pan-STARRS 1	·	2.0 km	MPC · JPL
628400	2015 BU_{104}	—	January 16, 2015	Haleakala	Pan-STARRS 1	·	1.3 km	MPC · JPL

== 628401–628500 ==
back to top

Designation			Discovery			Properties		Ref
Permanent	Provisional	Named after	Date	Site	Discoverer(s)	Category	Diam.	Ref
628401	2015 BH_{160}	—	October 9, 2007	Mount Lemmon	Mount Lemmon Survey	·	500 m	MPC · JPL
628402	2015 BS_{164}	—	August 14, 2013	Haleakala	Pan-STARRS 1	·	1.3 km	MPC · JPL
628403	2015 BB_{169}	—	January 17, 2015	Haleakala	Pan-STARRS 1	·	480 m	MPC · JPL
628404	2015 BC_{173}	—	November 3, 2008	Mount Lemmon	Mount Lemmon Survey	·	1.4 km	MPC · JPL
628405	2015 BC_{175}	—	January 17, 2015	Haleakala	Pan-STARRS 1	·	2.7 km	MPC · JPL
628406	2015 BV_{186}	—	September 12, 2007	Mount Lemmon	Mount Lemmon Survey	EOS	1.6 km	MPC · JPL
628407	2015 BH_{196}	—	January 17, 2015	Haleakala	Pan-STARRS 1	·	2.4 km	MPC · JPL
628408	2015 BN_{214}	—	November 6, 2008	Mount Lemmon	Mount Lemmon Survey	·	1.9 km	MPC · JPL
628409	2015 BV_{223}	—	December 26, 2014	Haleakala	Pan-STARRS 1	·	2.9 km	MPC · JPL
628410	2015 BX_{244}	—	September 14, 2007	Mount Lemmon	Mount Lemmon Survey	·	510 m	MPC · JPL
628411	2015 BS_{252}	—	January 18, 2015	Haleakala	Pan-STARRS 1	·	2.2 km	MPC · JPL
628412	2015 BQ_{300}	—	March 14, 2004	Kitt Peak	Spacewatch	·	1.0 km	MPC · JPL
628413	2015 BS_{311}	—	August 30, 2014	Haleakala	Pan-STARRS 1	GEF	970 m	MPC · JPL
628414	2015 BV_{355}	—	February 17, 2004	Kitt Peak	Spacewatch	HYG	2.3 km	MPC · JPL
628415	2015 BU_{356}	—	January 19, 2015	Kitt Peak	Spacewatch	·	1.8 km	MPC · JPL
628416	2015 BF_{391}	—	September 15, 2010	Kitt Peak	Spacewatch	·	540 m	MPC · JPL
628417	2015 BS_{395}	—	October 7, 2008	Kitt Peak	Spacewatch	·	1.1 km	MPC · JPL
628418	2015 BC_{408}	—	June 20, 2013	Haleakala	Pan-STARRS 1	·	580 m	MPC · JPL
628419	2015 BH_{413}	—	October 5, 2013	Kitt Peak	Spacewatch	·	1.8 km	MPC · JPL
628420	2015 BM_{423}	—	January 20, 2015	Haleakala	Pan-STARRS 1	·	2.6 km	MPC · JPL
628421	2015 BP_{469}	—	December 18, 2014	Haleakala	Pan-STARRS 1	·	520 m	MPC · JPL
628422	2015 BL_{488}	—	September 20, 2007	Kitt Peak	Spacewatch	·	540 m	MPC · JPL
628423	2015 BK_{527}	—	January 28, 2015	Haleakala	Pan-STARRS 1	H	450 m	MPC · JPL
628424	2015 BA_{532}	—	January 23, 2015	Haleakala	Pan-STARRS 1	·	2.4 km	MPC · JPL
628425	2015 BE_{567}	—	December 31, 2007	Kitt Peak	Spacewatch	·	720 m	MPC · JPL
628426	2015 BD_{581}	—	January 28, 2015	Haleakala	Pan-STARRS 1	LUT	3.0 km	MPC · JPL
628427	2015 BA_{606}	—	January 20, 2015	Haleakala	Pan-STARRS 1	·	560 m	MPC · JPL
628428	2015 BN_{606}	—	January 22, 2015	Haleakala	Pan-STARRS 1	·	2.5 km	MPC · JPL
628429	2015 CV_{4}	—	November 26, 2014	Haleakala	Pan-STARRS 1	·	2.1 km	MPC · JPL
628430	2015 CX_{18}	—	August 12, 2013	Haleakala	Pan-STARRS 1	·	530 m	MPC · JPL
628431	2015 CZ_{20}	—	September 10, 2007	Kitt Peak	Spacewatch	·	1.9 km	MPC · JPL
628432	2015 CL_{22}	—	August 14, 2012	Haleakala	Pan-STARRS 1	EOS	1.6 km	MPC · JPL
628433	2015 CH_{31}	—	January 17, 2015	Haleakala	Pan-STARRS 1	·	2.5 km	MPC · JPL
628434	2015 CQ_{36}	—	November 20, 2008	Kitt Peak	Spacewatch	·	2.6 km	MPC · JPL
628435	2015 CN_{45}	—	January 27, 2015	Haleakala	Pan-STARRS 1	·	2.1 km	MPC · JPL
628436	2015 CU_{67}	—	January 18, 2015	Haleakala	Pan-STARRS 1	·	2.6 km	MPC · JPL
628437	2015 DQ_{3}	—	January 16, 2015	Haleakala	Pan-STARRS 1	·	560 m	MPC · JPL
628438	2015 DC_{21}	—	July 14, 2013	Haleakala	Pan-STARRS 1	·	470 m	MPC · JPL
628439	2015 DF_{60}	—	September 2, 2010	Mount Lemmon	Mount Lemmon Survey	·	460 m	MPC · JPL
628440	2015 DY_{75}	—	November 12, 2007	Mount Lemmon	Mount Lemmon Survey	·	440 m	MPC · JPL
628441	2015 DE_{82}	—	October 14, 2013	Kitt Peak	Spacewatch	·	1.9 km	MPC · JPL
628442	2015 DO_{85}	—	January 20, 2015	Haleakala	Pan-STARRS 1	·	2.4 km	MPC · JPL
628443	2015 DH_{94}	—	September 19, 2012	Mount Lemmon	Mount Lemmon Survey	·	2.1 km	MPC · JPL
628444	2015 DY_{94}	—	December 14, 2010	Mount Lemmon	Mount Lemmon Survey	·	610 m	MPC · JPL
628445	2015 DZ_{96}	—	October 2, 2010	Mount Lemmon	Mount Lemmon Survey	·	570 m	MPC · JPL
628446	2015 DL_{102}	—	January 17, 2015	Haleakala	Pan-STARRS 1	·	2.2 km	MPC · JPL
628447	2015 DO_{174}	—	November 22, 2014	Mount Lemmon	Mount Lemmon Survey	·	2.9 km	MPC · JPL
628448	2015 DT_{204}	—	February 23, 2015	Haleakala	Pan-STARRS 1	·	3.0 km	MPC · JPL
628449	2015 DH_{205}	—	September 8, 2007	Mount Lemmon	Mount Lemmon Survey	TIR	2.6 km	MPC · JPL
628450	2015 DY_{215}	—	January 15, 2015	Haleakala	Pan-STARRS 1	·	420 m	MPC · JPL
628451	2015 DC_{223}	—	January 20, 2015	Haleakala	Pan-STARRS 1	·	1.1 km	MPC · JPL
628452	2015 DX_{250}	—	February 23, 2015	Haleakala	Pan-STARRS 1	·	490 m	MPC · JPL
628453	2015 DR_{277}	—	November 8, 2007	Mount Lemmon	Mount Lemmon Survey	·	510 m	MPC · JPL
628454	2015 DJ_{284}	—	June 5, 2016	Haleakala	Pan-STARRS 1	·	2.1 km	MPC · JPL
628455	2015 EA_{31}	—	November 11, 2013	Mount Lemmon	Mount Lemmon Survey	EOS	1.5 km	MPC · JPL
628456	2015 EU_{39}	—	March 14, 2015	Haleakala	Pan-STARRS 1	·	2.5 km	MPC · JPL
628457	2015 EY_{50}	—	October 30, 2008	Kitt Peak	Spacewatch	·	1.4 km	MPC · JPL
628458	2015 EH_{52}	—	October 4, 2007	Kitt Peak	Spacewatch	·	2.2 km	MPC · JPL
628459	2015 FG_{56}	—	January 21, 2015	Haleakala	Pan-STARRS 1	·	2.3 km	MPC · JPL
628460	2015 FM_{61}	—	October 6, 2013	Kitt Peak	Spacewatch	·	2.1 km	MPC · JPL
628461	2015 FQ_{85}	—	January 25, 2015	Haleakala	Pan-STARRS 1	·	2.1 km	MPC · JPL
628462	2015 FL_{89}	—	September 22, 2012	Mount Lemmon	Mount Lemmon Survey	VER	2.0 km	MPC · JPL
628463	2015 FF_{94}	—	February 1, 2009	Kitt Peak	Spacewatch	·	2.7 km	MPC · JPL
628464	2015 FU_{121}	—	February 23, 1998	Kitt Peak	Spacewatch	·	530 m	MPC · JPL
628465	2015 FP_{137}	—	November 10, 2013	Mount Lemmon	Mount Lemmon Survey	·	1.5 km	MPC · JPL
628466	2015 FS_{160}	—	October 2, 2006	Mount Lemmon	Mount Lemmon Survey	·	590 m	MPC · JPL
628467	2015 FD_{188}	—	December 30, 2008	Mount Lemmon	Mount Lemmon Survey	·	2.2 km	MPC · JPL
628468	2015 FN_{195}	—	August 10, 2007	Kitt Peak	Spacewatch	EUP	2.7 km	MPC · JPL
628469	2015 FH_{197}	—	August 24, 2012	Kitt Peak	Spacewatch	·	2.3 km	MPC · JPL
628470	2015 FD_{249}	—	October 30, 2007	Mount Lemmon	Mount Lemmon Survey	·	2.1 km	MPC · JPL
628471	2015 FJ_{253}	—	November 9, 2013	Mount Lemmon	Mount Lemmon Survey	·	1.6 km	MPC · JPL
628472	2015 FP_{259}	—	November 24, 2013	Haleakala	Pan-STARRS 1	·	1.7 km	MPC · JPL
628473	2015 FV_{295}	—	February 16, 2004	Kitt Peak	Spacewatch	(2076)	850 m	MPC · JPL
628474	2015 FY_{387}	—	November 12, 2007	Mount Lemmon	Mount Lemmon Survey	·	2.4 km	MPC · JPL
628475	2015 FZ_{445}	—	December 31, 2013	Haleakala	Pan-STARRS 1	VER	2.1 km	MPC · JPL
628476	2015 GS_{12}	—	September 3, 2013	Haleakala	Pan-STARRS 1	H	330 m	MPC · JPL
628477	2015 HJ_{43}	—	September 14, 2013	Haleakala	Pan-STARRS 1	H	340 m	MPC · JPL
628478	2015 HU_{143}	—	November 25, 2006	Kitt Peak	Spacewatch	·	950 m	MPC · JPL
628479	2015 HL_{155}	—	November 21, 2008	Mount Lemmon	Mount Lemmon Survey	EUP	3.0 km	MPC · JPL
628480	2015 HN_{210}	—	April 19, 2015	Kitt Peak	Spacewatch	H	300 m	MPC · JPL
628481	2015 KM_{44}	—	August 10, 2004	Campo Imperatore	CINEOS	·	850 m	MPC · JPL
628482	2015 KT_{52}	—	January 10, 2006	Mount Lemmon	Mount Lemmon Survey	·	1.1 km	MPC · JPL
628483	2015 KG_{89}	—	March 13, 2011	Mount Lemmon	Mount Lemmon Survey	V	580 m	MPC · JPL
628484	2015 KG_{130}	—	November 17, 2007	Kitt Peak	Spacewatch	·	3.0 km	MPC · JPL
628485	2015 KS_{141}	—	November 12, 2013	Mount Lemmon	Mount Lemmon Survey	·	900 m	MPC · JPL
628486	2015 KH_{167}	—	May 25, 2015	Haleakala	Pan-STARRS 1	T_{j} (2.86)	3.7 km	MPC · JPL
628487	2015 MX_{62}	—	October 8, 2012	Haleakala	Pan-STARRS 1	·	1.0 km	MPC · JPL
628488	2015 MP_{146}	—	June 26, 2015	Haleakala	Pan-STARRS 1	·	970 m	MPC · JPL
628489	2015 NS_{25}	—	June 4, 2015	Haleakala	Pan-STARRS 1	·	1.4 km	MPC · JPL
628490	2015 OJ_{8}	—	July 8, 2015	Haleakala	Pan-STARRS 1	·	1.4 km	MPC · JPL
628491	2015 OJ_{28}	—	October 20, 2003	Kitt Peak	Spacewatch	·	520 m	MPC · JPL
628492	2015 OZ_{28}	—	February 15, 2013	Haleakala	Pan-STARRS 1	·	770 m	MPC · JPL
628493	2015 OZ_{36}	—	September 27, 2003	Kitt Peak	Spacewatch	·	740 m	MPC · JPL
628494	2015 OV_{52}	—	January 28, 2014	Mayhill-ISON	L. Elenin	H	410 m	MPC · JPL
628495	2015 ON_{56}	—	July 26, 2015	Haleakala	Pan-STARRS 1	·	1.1 km	MPC · JPL
628496	2015 OP_{86}	—	January 26, 2012	Mount Lemmon	Mount Lemmon Survey	·	1.5 km	MPC · JPL
628497	2015 OX_{86}	—	September 28, 2011	Kitt Peak	Spacewatch	(5)	990 m	MPC · JPL
628498	2015 OP_{145}	—	July 24, 2015	Haleakala	Pan-STARRS 1	MAR	710 m	MPC · JPL
628499	2015 PX_{29}	—	October 1, 2000	Socorro	LINEAR	·	1.1 km	MPC · JPL
628500	2015 PN_{45}	—	February 5, 2013	Mount Lemmon	Mount Lemmon Survey	·	890 m	MPC · JPL

== 628501–628600 ==
back to top

Designation			Discovery			Properties		Ref
Permanent	Provisional	Named after	Date	Site	Discoverer(s)	Category	Diam.	Ref
628501	2015 PJ_{55}	—	September 4, 2011	Haleakala	Pan-STARRS 1	·	570 m	MPC · JPL
628502	2015 PQ_{131}	—	September 14, 2007	Kitt Peak	Spacewatch	·	790 m	MPC · JPL
628503	2015 PW_{282}	—	September 10, 2007	Mount Lemmon	Mount Lemmon Survey	H	310 m	MPC · JPL
628504	2015 PM_{283}	—	February 26, 2014	Haleakala	Pan-STARRS 1	·	1.1 km	MPC · JPL
628505	2015 PO_{284}	—	October 23, 2003	Kitt Peak	Spacewatch	·	610 m	MPC · JPL
628506	2015 PW_{309}	—	July 24, 2015	Haleakala	Pan-STARRS 1	·	2.1 km	MPC · JPL
628507	2015 QQ_{13}	—	October 25, 2011	Haleakala	Pan-STARRS 1	·	870 m	MPC · JPL
628508	2015 QH_{19}	—	November 1, 2008	Mount Lemmon	Mount Lemmon Survey	3:2	4.1 km	MPC · JPL
628509	2015 RJ	—	July 28, 2011	Haleakala	Pan-STARRS 1	·	890 m	MPC · JPL
628510	2015 RL_{7}	—	October 25, 2008	Kitt Peak	Spacewatch	·	990 m	MPC · JPL
628511	2015 RS_{43}	—	September 26, 2011	Mount Lemmon	Mount Lemmon Survey	·	610 m	MPC · JPL
628512	2015 RL_{51}	—	December 17, 2007	Mount Lemmon	Mount Lemmon Survey	·	790 m	MPC · JPL
628513	2015 RA_{60}	—	October 1, 2003	Kitt Peak	Spacewatch	·	750 m	MPC · JPL
628514	2015 RC_{62}	—	October 8, 2007	Mount Lemmon	Mount Lemmon Survey	·	920 m	MPC · JPL
628515	2015 RG_{65}	—	September 22, 2011	Kitt Peak	Spacewatch	·	720 m	MPC · JPL
628516	2015 RX_{72}	—	August 27, 2011	Haleakala	Pan-STARRS 1	PHO	1.1 km	MPC · JPL
628517	2015 RK_{80}	—	November 19, 2007	Kitt Peak	Spacewatch	(5)	890 m	MPC · JPL
628518	2015 RP_{118}	—	October 1, 2003	Anderson Mesa	LONEOS	·	1.0 km	MPC · JPL
628519	2015 RP_{120}	—	October 20, 2003	Kitt Peak	Spacewatch	·	720 m	MPC · JPL
628520	2015 RT_{126}	—	October 26, 2008	Kitt Peak	Spacewatch	3:2	3.8 km	MPC · JPL
628521	2015 RW_{143}	—	September 4, 2011	Haleakala	Pan-STARRS 1	HNS	920 m	MPC · JPL
628522	2015 RR_{156}	—	April 5, 2014	Haleakala	Pan-STARRS 1	·	1.1 km	MPC · JPL
628523	2015 RE_{169}	—	September 4, 2011	Haleakala	Pan-STARRS 1	·	950 m	MPC · JPL
628524	2015 RS_{197}	—	September 11, 2015	Haleakala	Pan-STARRS 1	MAR	730 m	MPC · JPL
628525	2015 RF_{201}	—	November 23, 2011	Catalina	CSS	·	1.2 km	MPC · JPL
628526	2015 RK_{205}	—	October 31, 2011	Mount Lemmon	Mount Lemmon Survey	MAR	1.1 km	MPC · JPL
628527	2015 RK_{229}	—	November 5, 2007	Kitt Peak	Spacewatch	(5)	850 m	MPC · JPL
628528	2015 RF_{235}	—	September 11, 2015	Haleakala	Pan-STARRS 1	EUN	990 m	MPC · JPL
628529	2015 RQ_{236}	—	December 16, 2011	Haleakala	Pan-STARRS 1	·	1.2 km	MPC · JPL
628530	2015 RO_{240}	—	October 1, 2006	Apache Point	SDSS Collaboration	·	1.4 km	MPC · JPL
628531	2015 RT_{255}	—	September 13, 2007	Mount Lemmon	Mount Lemmon Survey	·	900 m	MPC · JPL
628532	2015 RU_{255}	—	November 13, 2007	Mount Lemmon	Mount Lemmon Survey	EUN	910 m	MPC · JPL
628533	2015 RW_{259}	—	October 25, 2011	Haleakala	Pan-STARRS 1	·	1.1 km	MPC · JPL
628534	2015 RJ_{266}	—	September 9, 2015	Haleakala	Pan-STARRS 1	·	1.2 km	MPC · JPL
628535	2015 RP_{267}	—	May 4, 2009	Mount Lemmon	Mount Lemmon Survey	·	1.3 km	MPC · JPL
628536	2015 RF_{273}	—	May 25, 2014	Haleakala	Pan-STARRS 1	·	1.5 km	MPC · JPL
628537	2015 RY_{281}	—	September 9, 2015	Haleakala	Pan-STARRS 1	·	1.5 km	MPC · JPL
628538	2015 RX_{285}	—	December 16, 2007	Kitt Peak	Spacewatch	·	690 m	MPC · JPL
628539	2015 ST_{1}	—	October 19, 2011	Haleakala	Pan-STARRS 1	·	790 m	MPC · JPL
628540	2015 SG_{5}	—	September 20, 2015	Catalina	CSS	·	1.8 km	MPC · JPL
628541	2015 SQ_{10}	—	March 19, 2010	Mount Lemmon	Mount Lemmon Survey	V	600 m	MPC · JPL
628542	2015 SD_{14}	—	February 9, 2013	Haleakala	Pan-STARRS 1	MAR	750 m	MPC · JPL
628543	2015 SQ_{15}	—	September 19, 2003	Campo Imperatore	CINEOS	·	700 m	MPC · JPL
628544	2015 TJ_{10}	—	July 25, 2015	Haleakala	Pan-STARRS 1	·	750 m	MPC · JPL
628545	2015 TT_{10}	—	November 3, 2007	Mount Lemmon	Mount Lemmon Survey	BRG	1.1 km	MPC · JPL
628546	2015 TL_{15}	—	October 1, 2011	Mount Lemmon	Mount Lemmon Survey	·	590 m	MPC · JPL
628547	2015 TD_{47}	—	March 19, 2009	Mount Lemmon	Mount Lemmon Survey	KON	1.5 km	MPC · JPL
628548	2015 TC_{65}	—	November 18, 2011	Mount Lemmon	Mount Lemmon Survey	(5)	900 m	MPC · JPL
628549	2015 TE_{70}	—	August 19, 2006	Kitt Peak	Spacewatch	·	1.2 km	MPC · JPL
628550	2015 TT_{70}	—	November 25, 2011	Haleakala	Pan-STARRS 1	·	1.1 km	MPC · JPL
628551	2015 TZ_{74}	—	April 16, 2013	Cerro Tololo-DECam	DECam	·	950 m	MPC · JPL
628552	2015 TH_{75}	—	September 9, 2015	Haleakala	Pan-STARRS 1	·	1.1 km	MPC · JPL
628553	2015 TJ_{75}	—	October 31, 2011	Kitt Peak	Spacewatch	(5)	690 m	MPC · JPL
628554	2015 TQ_{80}	—	October 16, 2007	Mount Lemmon	Mount Lemmon Survey	(5)	990 m	MPC · JPL
628555	2015 TG_{82}	—	September 15, 2006	Kitt Peak	Spacewatch	·	1.3 km	MPC · JPL
628556	2015 TX_{89}	—	November 19, 2007	Mount Lemmon	Mount Lemmon Survey	·	1.0 km	MPC · JPL
628557	2015 TQ_{102}	—	December 29, 2011	Mount Lemmon	Mount Lemmon Survey	·	700 m	MPC · JPL
628558	2015 TR_{103}	—	October 8, 2015	Haleakala	Pan-STARRS 1	·	1.7 km	MPC · JPL
628559	2015 TU_{112}	—	February 9, 2008	Kitt Peak	Spacewatch	·	900 m	MPC · JPL
628560	2015 TG_{116}	—	August 21, 2006	Kitt Peak	Spacewatch	·	1.0 km	MPC · JPL
628561	2015 TU_{116}	—	January 16, 2008	Kitt Peak	Spacewatch	·	910 m	MPC · JPL
628562	2015 TP_{119}	—	October 8, 2015	Haleakala	Pan-STARRS 1	EUN	780 m	MPC · JPL
628563	2015 TR_{126}	—	October 8, 2015	Haleakala	Pan-STARRS 1	EUN	920 m	MPC · JPL
628564	2015 TB_{131}	—	July 4, 2010	Kitt Peak	Spacewatch	·	1.1 km	MPC · JPL
628565	2015 TD_{131}	—	February 13, 2008	Kitt Peak	Spacewatch	·	1.4 km	MPC · JPL
628566	2015 TB_{146}	—	November 19, 2003	Kitt Peak	Spacewatch	·	670 m	MPC · JPL
628567	2015 TH_{173}	—	October 9, 2015	Haleakala	Pan-STARRS 1	(5)	930 m	MPC · JPL
628568	2015 TW_{194}	—	December 15, 2007	Mount Lemmon	Mount Lemmon Survey	·	590 m	MPC · JPL
628569	2015 TC_{200}	—	October 14, 2007	Mount Lemmon	Mount Lemmon Survey	·	1.0 km	MPC · JPL
628570	2015 TP_{203}	—	November 2, 2007	Kitt Peak	Spacewatch	·	770 m	MPC · JPL
628571	2015 TZ_{229}	—	October 10, 2015	Haleakala	Pan-STARRS 1	·	1.4 km	MPC · JPL
628572	2015 TW_{230}	—	October 10, 2015	Haleakala	Pan-STARRS 1	·	1.2 km	MPC · JPL
628573	2015 TR_{243}	—	September 5, 2002	Socorro	LINEAR	·	1.2 km	MPC · JPL
628574	2015 TD_{259}	—	November 16, 2003	Kitt Peak	Spacewatch	(5)	700 m	MPC · JPL
628575	2015 TO_{274}	—	November 16, 2007	Mount Lemmon	Mount Lemmon Survey	·	770 m	MPC · JPL
628576	2015 TO_{275}	—	February 4, 2000	Kitt Peak	Spacewatch	(5)	1.1 km	MPC · JPL
628577	2015 TY_{277}	—	February 27, 2009	Kitt Peak	Spacewatch	MAR	770 m	MPC · JPL
628578	2015 TL_{281}	—	October 2, 2015	Mount Lemmon	Mount Lemmon Survey	·	1.1 km	MPC · JPL
628579	2015 TX_{289}	—	October 3, 2003	Kitt Peak	Spacewatch	·	450 m	MPC · JPL
628580	2015 TY_{297}	—	September 20, 2006	Kitt Peak	Spacewatch	·	1.3 km	MPC · JPL
628581	2015 TD_{301}	—	October 24, 2011	Kitt Peak	Spacewatch	·	1.1 km	MPC · JPL
628582	2015 TH_{303}	—	January 12, 2008	Kitt Peak	Spacewatch	·	1.1 km	MPC · JPL
628583	2015 TY_{303}	—	January 28, 2000	Kitt Peak	Spacewatch	(5)	970 m	MPC · JPL
628584	2015 TP_{319}	—	November 4, 2007	Mount Lemmon	Mount Lemmon Survey	KON	1.6 km	MPC · JPL
628585	2015 TJ_{320}	—	September 12, 2015	Haleakala	Pan-STARRS 1	·	1.4 km	MPC · JPL
628586	2015 TF_{321}	—	July 25, 2015	Haleakala	Pan-STARRS 1	·	960 m	MPC · JPL
628587	2015 TN_{333}	—	April 30, 2014	Haleakala	Pan-STARRS 1	KON	1.7 km	MPC · JPL
628588	2015 TE_{344}	—	November 3, 2011	Kitt Peak	Spacewatch	·	930 m	MPC · JPL
628589	2015 TB_{346}	—	November 9, 2007	Kitt Peak	Spacewatch	·	800 m	MPC · JPL
628590	2015 TR_{359}	—	September 2, 2010	Mount Lemmon	Mount Lemmon Survey	·	940 m	MPC · JPL
628591	2015 TT_{359}	—	December 6, 2011	Haleakala	Pan-STARRS 1	·	1.2 km	MPC · JPL
628592	2015 TE_{365}	—	November 12, 2007	Mount Lemmon	Mount Lemmon Survey	·	1.0 km	MPC · JPL
628593	2015 TN_{365}	—	May 28, 2014	Haleakala	Pan-STARRS 1	·	1.1 km	MPC · JPL
628594	2015 TO_{365}	—	October 8, 2015	Haleakala	Pan-STARRS 1	·	1.5 km	MPC · JPL
628595	2015 TP_{365}	—	December 27, 2011	Kitt Peak	Spacewatch	·	930 m	MPC · JPL
628596	2015 TQ_{365}	—	February 10, 2008	Mount Lemmon	Mount Lemmon Survey	·	1.3 km	MPC · JPL
628597	2015 TB_{366}	—	March 14, 2008	Mount Lemmon	Mount Lemmon Survey	·	1.3 km	MPC · JPL
628598	2015 TL_{366}	—	January 13, 2008	Kitt Peak	Spacewatch	·	1.0 km	MPC · JPL
628599	2015 TX_{368}	—	January 14, 2008	Kitt Peak	Spacewatch	·	1.1 km	MPC · JPL
628600	2015 TS_{378}	—	May 5, 2014	Mount Lemmon	Mount Lemmon Survey	·	930 m	MPC · JPL

== 628601–628700 ==
back to top

Designation			Discovery			Properties		Ref
Permanent	Provisional	Named after	Date	Site	Discoverer(s)	Category	Diam.	Ref
628601	2015 TU_{381}	—	January 16, 2008	Kitt Peak	Spacewatch	(5)	1.1 km	MPC · JPL
628602	2015 TQ_{386}	—	June 26, 2015	Haleakala	Pan-STARRS 1	EUN	830 m	MPC · JPL
628603	2015 TS_{388}	—	September 20, 2006	Palomar	NEAT	·	1.4 km	MPC · JPL
628604	2015 TD_{414}	—	October 8, 2015	Haleakala	Pan-STARRS 1	PAD	1.1 km	MPC · JPL
628605	2015 UT_{1}	—	November 4, 2007	Kitt Peak	Spacewatch	·	1.2 km	MPC · JPL
628606	2015 UJ_{3}	—	October 24, 2011	Haleakala	Pan-STARRS 1	·	1.0 km	MPC · JPL
628607	2015 UZ_{3}	—	October 20, 2011	Mount Lemmon	Mount Lemmon Survey	·	1.1 km	MPC · JPL
628608	2015 UY_{23}	—	November 15, 2011	Mount Lemmon	Mount Lemmon Survey	EUN	950 m	MPC · JPL
628609	2015 UM_{24}	—	October 24, 2011	Mount Lemmon	Mount Lemmon Survey	·	1.0 km	MPC · JPL
628610	2015 UZ_{32}	—	April 4, 2005	Mount Lemmon	Mount Lemmon Survey	·	1.3 km	MPC · JPL
628611	2015 UJ_{47}	—	October 9, 2015	Haleakala	Pan-STARRS 1	HNS	780 m	MPC · JPL
628612	2015 UL_{58}	—	October 19, 2015	Haleakala	Pan-STARRS 1	GEF	1.2 km	MPC · JPL
628613	2015 UN_{68}	—	October 26, 2011	Haleakala	Pan-STARRS 1	·	760 m	MPC · JPL
628614	2015 UJ_{72}	—	October 21, 2011	Kitt Peak	Spacewatch	(5)	790 m	MPC · JPL
628615	2015 UU_{85}	—	October 21, 2015	Haleakala	Pan-STARRS 1	·	1.3 km	MPC · JPL
628616	2015 UO_{86}	—	October 23, 2015	Mount Lemmon	Mount Lemmon Survey	EUN	930 m	MPC · JPL
628617	2015 UU_{103}	—	October 23, 2015	Mount Lemmon	Mount Lemmon Survey	·	960 m	MPC · JPL
628618	2015 VO_{5}	—	May 7, 2014	Haleakala	Pan-STARRS 1	·	1.6 km	MPC · JPL
628619	2015 VO_{7}	—	April 15, 2010	Mount Lemmon	Mount Lemmon Survey	·	890 m	MPC · JPL
628620	2015 VO_{17}	—	October 20, 2007	Mount Lemmon	Mount Lemmon Survey	KON	1.4 km	MPC · JPL
628621	2015 VO_{28}	—	October 18, 2007	Kitt Peak	Spacewatch	H	420 m	MPC · JPL
628622	2015 VH_{29}	—	December 30, 2007	Mount Lemmon	Mount Lemmon Survey	·	910 m	MPC · JPL
628623	2015 VY_{30}	—	September 15, 2006	Kitt Peak	Spacewatch	·	1.3 km	MPC · JPL
628624	2015 VV_{35}	—	October 21, 2006	Kitt Peak	Spacewatch	·	1.6 km	MPC · JPL
628625	2015 VX_{35}	—	October 25, 2011	Haleakala	Pan-STARRS 1	EUN	880 m	MPC · JPL
628626	2015 VL_{41}	—	August 29, 2002	Palomar	NEAT	·	880 m	MPC · JPL
628627	2015 VM_{46}	—	July 28, 2011	Haleakala	Pan-STARRS 1	·	1.2 km	MPC · JPL
628628	2015 VD_{52}	—	September 9, 2015	Haleakala	Pan-STARRS 1	·	1.0 km	MPC · JPL
628629	2015 VL_{57}	—	November 3, 2007	Kitt Peak	Spacewatch	(5)	1.1 km	MPC · JPL
628630	2015 VG_{60}	—	May 4, 2014	Mount Lemmon	Mount Lemmon Survey	·	1.4 km	MPC · JPL
628631	2015 VB_{62}	—	March 19, 2013	Haleakala	Pan-STARRS 1	(5)	940 m	MPC · JPL
628632	2015 VR_{71}	—	January 11, 2008	Mount Lemmon	Mount Lemmon Survey	·	840 m	MPC · JPL
628633	2015 VA_{72}	—	November 3, 2015	Haleakala	Pan-STARRS 1	·	1.5 km	MPC · JPL
628634	2015 VH_{81}	—	November 30, 2011	Mount Lemmon	Mount Lemmon Survey	·	1.2 km	MPC · JPL
628635	2015 VA_{84}	—	November 26, 2003	Kitt Peak	Spacewatch	EUN	860 m	MPC · JPL
628636	2015 VN_{92}	—	November 2, 2015	Kitt Peak	Spacewatch	MAR	830 m	MPC · JPL
628637	2015 VR_{105}	—	November 6, 2010	Mount Lemmon	Mount Lemmon Survey	H	430 m	MPC · JPL
628638	2015 VQ_{109}	—	August 28, 2002	Palomar	NEAT	·	960 m	MPC · JPL
628639	2015 VW_{109}	—	November 27, 2011	Kitt Peak	Spacewatch	·	890 m	MPC · JPL
628640	2015 VN_{111}	—	November 4, 2007	Kitt Peak	Spacewatch	·	370 m	MPC · JPL
628641	2015 VX_{112}	—	May 21, 2014	Mount Lemmon	Mount Lemmon Survey	·	1.1 km	MPC · JPL
628642	2015 VA_{117}	—	September 18, 2010	Mount Lemmon	Mount Lemmon Survey	·	1.5 km	MPC · JPL
628643	2015 VC_{119}	—	December 30, 2007	Kitt Peak	Spacewatch	·	1.2 km	MPC · JPL
628644	2015 VV_{119}	—	August 14, 2002	Siding Spring	K. S. Russell, R. H. McNaught	EUN	1.2 km	MPC · JPL
628645	2015 VX_{120}	—	November 11, 2007	Mount Lemmon	Mount Lemmon Survey	(5)	950 m	MPC · JPL
628646	2015 VW_{132}	—	November 18, 2007	Mount Lemmon	Mount Lemmon Survey	·	810 m	MPC · JPL
628647	2015 VO_{137}	—	November 25, 2011	Haleakala	Pan-STARRS 1	·	960 m	MPC · JPL
628648	2015 VS_{145}	—	November 19, 2007	Kitt Peak	Spacewatch	(5)	930 m	MPC · JPL
628649	2015 VQ_{152}	—	September 19, 1998	Apache Point	SDSS Collaboration	·	940 m	MPC · JPL
628650	2015 VY_{155}	—	July 27, 2014	Haleakala	Pan-STARRS 1	·	1.1 km	MPC · JPL
628651	2015 VF_{158}	—	December 30, 2007	Mount Lemmon	Mount Lemmon Survey	·	1 km	MPC · JPL
628652	2015 VB_{160}	—	December 30, 2011	Mount Lemmon	Mount Lemmon Survey	MAR	940 m	MPC · JPL
628653	2015 VT_{161}	—	August 28, 2006	Kitt Peak	Spacewatch	·	1.1 km	MPC · JPL
628654	2015 VK_{163}	—	March 15, 2004	Kitt Peak	Spacewatch	·	1.3 km	MPC · JPL
628655	2015 VO_{189}	—	November 1, 2015	Mount Lemmon	Mount Lemmon Survey	EUN	940 m	MPC · JPL
628656	2015 XD_{7}	—	January 19, 2008	Mount Lemmon	Mount Lemmon Survey	·	740 m	MPC · JPL
628657	2015 XZ_{20}	—	June 30, 2014	Haleakala	Pan-STARRS 1	·	1.3 km	MPC · JPL
628658	2015 XS_{30}	—	January 15, 2008	Kitt Peak	Spacewatch	(5)	1.1 km	MPC · JPL
628659	2015 XH_{31}	—	September 12, 2002	Palomar	NEAT	·	950 m	MPC · JPL
628660	2015 XJ_{32}	—	January 10, 2008	Kitt Peak	Spacewatch	·	1.5 km	MPC · JPL
628661	2015 XX_{46}	—	October 26, 2011	Haleakala	Pan-STARRS 1	·	1.3 km	MPC · JPL
628662	2015 XK_{47}	—	March 24, 2009	Kitt Peak	Spacewatch	·	1.1 km	MPC · JPL
628663	2015 XA_{51}	—	November 9, 2015	Mount Lemmon	Mount Lemmon Survey	·	1.4 km	MPC · JPL
628664	2015 XK_{59}	—	May 7, 2014	Haleakala	Pan-STARRS 1	(5)	940 m	MPC · JPL
628665	2015 XQ_{62}	—	September 17, 2006	Kitt Peak	Spacewatch	·	1.1 km	MPC · JPL
628666	2015 XB_{64}	—	July 25, 2014	Haleakala	Pan-STARRS 1	·	1.3 km	MPC · JPL
628667	2015 XD_{64}	—	January 2, 2012	Mount Lemmon	Mount Lemmon Survey	·	1.2 km	MPC · JPL
628668	2015 XR_{67}	—	January 4, 2012	Mount Lemmon	Mount Lemmon Survey	NEM	1.7 km	MPC · JPL
628669	2015 XU_{69}	—	September 10, 2002	Haleakala	NEAT	(5)	1.1 km	MPC · JPL
628670	2015 XP_{71}	—	December 30, 2007	Mount Lemmon	Mount Lemmon Survey	·	710 m	MPC · JPL
628671	2015 XS_{84}	—	September 28, 1997	Kitt Peak	Spacewatch	·	1.3 km	MPC · JPL
628672	2015 XL_{88}	—	September 19, 2015	Haleakala	Pan-STARRS 1	(5)	980 m	MPC · JPL
628673	2015 XV_{97}	—	December 4, 2015	Haleakala	Pan-STARRS 1	·	1.4 km	MPC · JPL
628674	2015 XP_{99}	—	April 7, 2008	Kitt Peak	Spacewatch	·	1.5 km	MPC · JPL
628675	2015 XN_{111}	—	February 8, 2008	Mount Lemmon	Mount Lemmon Survey	·	1.3 km	MPC · JPL
628676	2015 XQ_{114}	—	April 16, 2013	Cerro Tololo-DECam	DECam	WIT	660 m	MPC · JPL
628677	2015 XA_{132}	—	August 24, 2006	Palomar	NEAT	·	1.1 km	MPC · JPL
628678	2015 XV_{137}	—	December 4, 2015	Mount Lemmon	Mount Lemmon Survey	·	1.1 km	MPC · JPL
628679	2015 XT_{138}	—	January 14, 2012	Mount Lemmon	Mount Lemmon Survey	·	1.3 km	MPC · JPL
628680	2015 XA_{140}	—	September 19, 2015	Haleakala	Pan-STARRS 1	·	1.3 km	MPC · JPL
628681	2015 XG_{145}	—	December 3, 2007	Kitt Peak	Spacewatch	·	1.1 km	MPC · JPL
628682	2015 XB_{150}	—	November 27, 2011	Mount Lemmon	Mount Lemmon Survey	HNS	990 m	MPC · JPL
628683	2015 XH_{161}	—	November 22, 2006	Kitt Peak	Spacewatch	·	1.5 km	MPC · JPL
628684	2015 XZ_{161}	—	December 4, 2007	Catalina	CSS	·	850 m	MPC · JPL
628685	2015 XB_{172}	—	September 18, 2006	Kitt Peak	Spacewatch	·	960 m	MPC · JPL
628686	2015 XC_{176}	—	September 30, 2006	Kitt Peak	Spacewatch	·	1.2 km	MPC · JPL
628687	2015 XZ_{179}	—	February 28, 2008	Mount Lemmon	Mount Lemmon Survey	PAD	1.4 km	MPC · JPL
628688	2015 XX_{180}	—	October 31, 2006	Mount Lemmon	Mount Lemmon Survey	·	1.2 km	MPC · JPL
628689	2015 XG_{183}	—	September 4, 2010	Kitt Peak	Spacewatch	·	1.4 km	MPC · JPL
628690	2015 XQ_{187}	—	September 27, 2006	Kitt Peak	Spacewatch	·	1.1 km	MPC · JPL
628691	2015 XF_{189}	—	November 5, 2007	Mount Lemmon	Mount Lemmon Survey	·	940 m	MPC · JPL
628692	2015 XL_{195}	—	November 18, 2006	Kitt Peak	Spacewatch	·	1.6 km	MPC · JPL
628693	2015 XS_{195}	—	August 3, 2014	Haleakala	Pan-STARRS 1	AST	1.4 km	MPC · JPL
628694	2015 XV_{201}	—	February 24, 2008	Mount Lemmon	Mount Lemmon Survey	·	1.4 km	MPC · JPL
628695	2015 XT_{202}	—	August 30, 2002	Kitt Peak	Spacewatch	·	1.2 km	MPC · JPL
628696	2015 XQ_{208}	—	March 13, 2008	Kitt Peak	Spacewatch	(12739)	1.2 km	MPC · JPL
628697	2015 XX_{211}	—	April 15, 2008	Mount Lemmon	Mount Lemmon Survey	MRX	1.0 km	MPC · JPL
628698	2015 XV_{214}	—	November 8, 2015	Happy Jack	Wasserman, L. H.	·	1.2 km	MPC · JPL
628699	2015 XB_{229}	—	August 20, 2014	Haleakala	Pan-STARRS 1	·	1.2 km	MPC · JPL
628700	2015 XG_{230}	—	July 8, 2014	Haleakala	Pan-STARRS 1	·	1.3 km	MPC · JPL

== 628701–628800 ==
back to top

Designation			Discovery			Properties		Ref
Permanent	Provisional	Named after	Date	Site	Discoverer(s)	Category	Diam.	Ref
628701	2015 XK_{235}	—	January 1, 2012	Mount Lemmon	Mount Lemmon Survey	·	930 m	MPC · JPL
628702	2015 XY_{238}	—	November 22, 2015	Mount Lemmon	Mount Lemmon Survey	·	1.1 km	MPC · JPL
628703	2015 XB_{243}	—	April 12, 2013	Haleakala	Pan-STARRS 1	·	1.3 km	MPC · JPL
628704	2015 XF_{244}	—	March 5, 2008	Mount Lemmon	Mount Lemmon Survey	·	1.2 km	MPC · JPL
628705	2015 XP_{259}	—	December 8, 2015	Mount Lemmon	Mount Lemmon Survey	·	1.3 km	MPC · JPL
628706	2015 XG_{269}	—	January 18, 2012	Mount Lemmon	Mount Lemmon Survey	(17392)	1.1 km	MPC · JPL
628707	2015 XO_{278}	—	December 27, 2011	Mount Lemmon	Mount Lemmon Survey	·	1.2 km	MPC · JPL
628708	2015 XY_{292}	—	September 14, 2006	Kitt Peak	Spacewatch	·	940 m	MPC · JPL
628709	2015 XM_{298}	—	March 10, 2008	Mount Lemmon	Mount Lemmon Survey	DOR	1.6 km	MPC · JPL
628710	2015 XB_{313}	—	August 21, 2015	Haleakala	Pan-STARRS 1	·	970 m	MPC · JPL
628711	2015 XJ_{313}	—	September 29, 1973	Palomar	C. J. van Houten, I. van Houten-Groeneveld, T. Gehrels	(5)	1.2 km	MPC · JPL
628712	2015 XH_{334}	—	March 29, 2008	Kitt Peak	Spacewatch	·	1.3 km	MPC · JPL
628713	2015 XE_{338}	—	October 11, 2010	Mount Lemmon	Mount Lemmon Survey	·	1.4 km	MPC · JPL
628714	2015 XX_{341}	—	December 14, 2007	Mount Lemmon	Mount Lemmon Survey	·	1.0 km	MPC · JPL
628715	2015 XQ_{350}	—	February 12, 2008	Mount Lemmon	Mount Lemmon Survey	·	1.5 km	MPC · JPL
628716	2015 XL_{361}	—	October 8, 2015	Haleakala	Pan-STARRS 1	·	880 m	MPC · JPL
628717	2015 XG_{366}	—	January 4, 2012	Mount Lemmon	Mount Lemmon Survey	·	1.7 km	MPC · JPL
628718	2015 XH_{382}	—	December 30, 2011	Kitt Peak	Spacewatch	·	910 m	MPC · JPL
628719	2015 XN_{382}	—	August 19, 2006	Kitt Peak	Spacewatch	·	1.1 km	MPC · JPL
628720	2015 XG_{384}	—	November 2, 2007	Mount Lemmon	Mount Lemmon Survey	(5)	940 m	MPC · JPL
628721	2015 XZ_{396}	—	March 27, 2012	Mount Lemmon	Mount Lemmon Survey	·	1.8 km	MPC · JPL
628722	2015 XV_{401}	—	September 21, 2010	Bergisch Gladbach	W. Bickel	·	1.5 km	MPC · JPL
628723	2015 XU_{407}	—	October 29, 2010	Mount Lemmon	Mount Lemmon Survey	·	1.3 km	MPC · JPL
628724	2015 XA_{415}	—	November 18, 2014	Haleakala	Pan-STARRS 1	·	2.2 km	MPC · JPL
628725	2015 XH_{416}	—	September 5, 2010	Mount Lemmon	Mount Lemmon Survey	·	1.3 km	MPC · JPL
628726	2015 XV_{419}	—	November 26, 2014	Haleakala	Pan-STARRS 1	·	1.8 km	MPC · JPL
628727	2015 XX_{420}	—	February 7, 2008	Mount Lemmon	Mount Lemmon Survey	AGN	1.3 km	MPC · JPL
628728	2015 YO_{3}	—	December 7, 2015	Haleakala	Pan-STARRS 1	·	1.2 km	MPC · JPL
628729	2015 YA_{6}	—	January 16, 2004	Kitt Peak	Spacewatch	·	910 m	MPC · JPL
628730	2015 YP_{7}	—	December 9, 2015	Haleakala	Pan-STARRS 1	·	1.5 km	MPC · JPL
628731	2015 YW_{7}	—	February 9, 2008	Mount Lemmon	Mount Lemmon Survey	·	960 m	MPC · JPL
628732	2015 YH_{13}	—	February 7, 2008	Mount Lemmon	Mount Lemmon Survey	·	820 m	MPC · JPL
628733	2015 YZ_{19}	—	February 10, 2008	Kitt Peak	Spacewatch	EUN	1.0 km	MPC · JPL
628734	2015 YH_{23}	—	January 27, 2007	Mount Lemmon	Mount Lemmon Survey	·	1.6 km	MPC · JPL
628735	2015 YT_{24}	—	September 2, 2014	Haleakala	Pan-STARRS 1	·	1.8 km	MPC · JPL
628736	2016 AX_{6}	—	December 22, 2006	Kitt Peak	Spacewatch	EUN	1.1 km	MPC · JPL
628737	2016 AP_{19}	—	October 3, 2006	Mount Lemmon	Mount Lemmon Survey	·	1.1 km	MPC · JPL
628738	2016 AL_{20}	—	March 13, 2012	Mount Lemmon	Mount Lemmon Survey	·	1.6 km	MPC · JPL
628739	2016 AK_{24}	—	October 22, 2014	Mount Lemmon	Mount Lemmon Survey	·	2.6 km	MPC · JPL
628740	2016 AB_{25}	—	January 3, 2016	Haleakala	Pan-STARRS 1	·	1.4 km	MPC · JPL
628741	2016 AT_{40}	—	February 1, 2012	Kitt Peak	Spacewatch	·	1.5 km	MPC · JPL
628742	2016 AB_{44}	—	September 29, 2010	Mount Lemmon	Mount Lemmon Survey	·	1.3 km	MPC · JPL
628743	2016 AH_{44}	—	September 30, 2006	Kitt Peak	Spacewatch	MIS	1.8 km	MPC · JPL
628744	2016 AJ_{46}	—	November 14, 2010	Kitt Peak	Spacewatch	AGN	890 m	MPC · JPL
628745	2016 AJ_{49}	—	March 15, 2012	Mount Lemmon	Mount Lemmon Survey	·	1.6 km	MPC · JPL
628746	2016 AC_{56}	—	December 27, 2006	Mount Lemmon	Mount Lemmon Survey	·	1.6 km	MPC · JPL
628747	2016 AO_{58}	—	March 17, 2012	Mount Lemmon	Mount Lemmon Survey	HOF	2.0 km	MPC · JPL
628748	2016 AP_{58}	—	November 7, 2005	Mauna Kea	A. Boattini	·	1.3 km	MPC · JPL
628749	2016 AG_{63}	—	September 2, 2014	Haleakala	Pan-STARRS 1	·	1.8 km	MPC · JPL
628750	2016 AJ_{68}	—	January 25, 2007	Kitt Peak	Spacewatch	·	1.8 km	MPC · JPL
628751	2016 AL_{73}	—	December 9, 2006	Kitt Peak	Spacewatch	·	1.5 km	MPC · JPL
628752	2016 AU_{86}	—	April 15, 2008	Mount Lemmon	Mount Lemmon Survey	·	1.3 km	MPC · JPL
628753	2016 AP_{88}	—	September 11, 2005	Kitt Peak	Spacewatch	AST	1.2 km	MPC · JPL
628754	2016 AJ_{116}	—	February 10, 2011	Mount Lemmon	Mount Lemmon Survey	·	1.5 km	MPC · JPL
628755	2016 AM_{142}	—	April 1, 2012	Mount Lemmon	Mount Lemmon Survey	·	1.5 km	MPC · JPL
628756	2016 AH_{145}	—	January 19, 2012	Mount Lemmon	Mount Lemmon Survey	·	1.1 km	MPC · JPL
628757	2016 AB_{190}	—	January 26, 2007	Kitt Peak	Spacewatch	·	1.4 km	MPC · JPL
628758	2016 AU_{213}	—	January 14, 2016	Haleakala	Pan-STARRS 1	·	1.5 km	MPC · JPL
628759	2016 AF_{219}	—	September 19, 2014	Haleakala	Pan-STARRS 1	·	1.4 km	MPC · JPL
628760	2016 AF_{221}	—	December 4, 2010	Mount Lemmon	Mount Lemmon Survey	·	1.5 km	MPC · JPL
628761	2016 AK_{228}	—	October 21, 2008	Mount Lemmon	Mount Lemmon Survey	EOS	1.5 km	MPC · JPL
628762	2016 AM_{233}	—	November 12, 2010	Mount Lemmon	Mount Lemmon Survey	·	1.1 km	MPC · JPL
628763	2016 AV_{242}	—	September 19, 2014	Haleakala	Pan-STARRS 1	HOF	2.1 km	MPC · JPL
628764	2016 AP_{245}	—	July 25, 2014	Haleakala	Pan-STARRS 1	·	1.2 km	MPC · JPL
628765	2016 AD_{249}	—	July 28, 2014	Haleakala	Pan-STARRS 1	ADE	1.2 km	MPC · JPL
628766	2016 AS_{268}	—	October 28, 2010	Mount Lemmon	Mount Lemmon Survey	·	1.1 km	MPC · JPL
628767	2016 AR_{272}	—	January 27, 2007	Kitt Peak	Spacewatch	·	1.9 km	MPC · JPL
628768	2016 AD_{306}	—	January 8, 2016	Haleakala	Pan-STARRS 1	·	770 m	MPC · JPL
628769	2016 AA_{363}	—	March 1, 2011	Catalina	CSS	T_{j} (2.98) · EUP	2.3 km	MPC · JPL
628770	2016 BB_{9}	—	October 9, 2008	Mount Lemmon	Mount Lemmon Survey	EOS	1.6 km	MPC · JPL
628771	2016 BR_{13}	—	December 6, 2011	Haleakala	Pan-STARRS 1	(1547)	1.4 km	MPC · JPL
628772	2016 BH_{85}	—	May 22, 2011	Mount Lemmon	Mount Lemmon Survey	·	1.9 km	MPC · JPL
628773	2016 BC_{93}	—	January 17, 2016	Haleakala	Pan-STARRS 1	·	1.4 km	MPC · JPL
628774	2016 BC_{103}	—	April 13, 2012	Haleakala	Pan-STARRS 1	·	1.5 km	MPC · JPL
628775	2016 BX_{105}	—	January 16, 2016	Haleakala	Pan-STARRS 1	H	440 m	MPC · JPL
628776	2016 BJ_{113}	—	February 8, 2011	Mount Lemmon	Mount Lemmon Survey	·	1.3 km	MPC · JPL
628777	2016 BH_{115}	—	January 16, 2016	Haleakala	Pan-STARRS 1	·	2.3 km	MPC · JPL
628778	2016 CR_{7}	—	January 25, 2006	Kitt Peak	Spacewatch	·	1.6 km	MPC · JPL
628779	2016 CB_{15}	—	December 15, 2006	Kitt Peak	Spacewatch	·	1.3 km	MPC · JPL
628780	2016 CO_{51}	—	January 3, 2016	Haleakala	Pan-STARRS 1	·	2.9 km	MPC · JPL
628781	2016 CE_{56}	—	March 14, 2007	Kitt Peak	Spacewatch	615	1.3 km	MPC · JPL
628782	2016 CP_{56}	—	February 3, 2016	Haleakala	Pan-STARRS 1	·	1.4 km	MPC · JPL
628783	2016 CX_{70}	—	March 14, 2007	Mount Lemmon	Mount Lemmon Survey	·	1.7 km	MPC · JPL
628784	2016 CC_{78}	—	October 4, 2014	Mount Lemmon	Mount Lemmon Survey	BRA	1.1 km	MPC · JPL
628785	2016 CP_{87}	—	February 12, 2011	Mount Lemmon	Mount Lemmon Survey	·	2.3 km	MPC · JPL
628786	2016 CV_{89}	—	May 14, 2006	Palomar	NEAT	·	2.6 km	MPC · JPL
628787	2016 CN_{100}	—	April 29, 2012	Mount Lemmon	Mount Lemmon Survey	·	1.6 km	MPC · JPL
628788	2016 CK_{153}	—	January 4, 2011	Mount Lemmon	Mount Lemmon Survey	·	2.1 km	MPC · JPL
628789	2016 CP_{156}	—	December 12, 2010	Mount Lemmon	Mount Lemmon Survey	·	2.3 km	MPC · JPL
628790	2016 CG_{160}	—	October 7, 2005	Mauna Kea	A. Boattini	·	1.5 km	MPC · JPL
628791	2016 CY_{171}	—	January 15, 2016	Haleakala	Pan-STARRS 1	·	1.4 km	MPC · JPL
628792	2016 CF_{215}	—	January 7, 2010	Mount Lemmon	Mount Lemmon Survey	·	2.1 km	MPC · JPL
628793	2016 CM_{233}	—	August 22, 2014	Haleakala	Pan-STARRS 1	·	1.6 km	MPC · JPL
628794	2016 CM_{234}	—	November 27, 2014	Haleakala	Pan-STARRS 1	·	2.1 km	MPC · JPL
628795	2016 CJ_{252}	—	January 26, 2011	Mount Lemmon	Mount Lemmon Survey	·	1.7 km	MPC · JPL
628796	2016 CR_{275}	—	October 15, 2009	Mount Lemmon	Mount Lemmon Survey	KOR	830 m	MPC · JPL
628797	2016 CE_{283}	—	March 2, 2011	Mount Lemmon	Mount Lemmon Survey	·	2.1 km	MPC · JPL
628798	2016 CH_{287}	—	March 1, 2011	Mount Lemmon	Mount Lemmon Survey	·	1.4 km	MPC · JPL
628799	2016 CN_{293}	—	January 3, 2011	Mount Lemmon	Mount Lemmon Survey	·	1.5 km	MPC · JPL
628800	2016 CY_{297}	—	March 2, 2006	Kitt Peak	Spacewatch	·	1.7 km	MPC · JPL

== 628801–628900 ==
back to top

Designation			Discovery			Properties		Ref
Permanent	Provisional	Named after	Date	Site	Discoverer(s)	Category	Diam.	Ref
628801	2016 CM_{373}	—	November 26, 2014	Haleakala	Pan-STARRS 1	·	1.9 km	MPC · JPL
628802	2016 CU_{399}	—	February 3, 2016	Haleakala	Pan-STARRS 1	·	1.9 km	MPC · JPL
628803	2016 DH_{23}	—	September 10, 2010	Kitt Peak	Spacewatch	(1547)	1.3 km	MPC · JPL
628804	2016 EX_{9}	—	January 11, 2016	Haleakala	Pan-STARRS 1	·	2.3 km	MPC · JPL
628805	2016 EG_{62}	—	December 10, 2014	Mount Lemmon	Mount Lemmon Survey	·	2.4 km	MPC · JPL
628806	2016 EA_{72}	—	February 17, 2010	Kitt Peak	Spacewatch	EOS	2.0 km	MPC · JPL
628807	2016 EO_{96}	—	November 11, 2009	Mount Lemmon	Mount Lemmon Survey	·	1.4 km	MPC · JPL
628808	2016 EE_{138}	—	January 18, 2016	Haleakala	Pan-STARRS 1	THM	2.3 km	MPC · JPL
628809	2016 ER_{153}	—	March 13, 2005	Kitt Peak	Spacewatch	·	2.0 km	MPC · JPL
628810	2016 EG_{176}	—	January 8, 2016	Haleakala	Pan-STARRS 1	TIR	2.4 km	MPC · JPL
628811	2016 EL_{190}	—	December 10, 2014	Mount Lemmon	Mount Lemmon Survey	EOS	1.6 km	MPC · JPL
628812	2016 EF_{191}	—	September 13, 2013	Mount Lemmon	Mount Lemmon Survey	·	2.0 km	MPC · JPL
628813	2016 ES_{227}	—	September 19, 2003	Kitt Peak	Spacewatch	·	1.4 km	MPC · JPL
628814	2016 EV_{227}	—	January 30, 2011	Mount Lemmon	Mount Lemmon Survey	·	1.6 km	MPC · JPL
628815	2016 EU_{228}	—	April 4, 2005	Mount Lemmon	Mount Lemmon Survey	·	2.0 km	MPC · JPL
628816	2016 EB_{244}	—	December 29, 2014	Haleakala	Pan-STARRS 1	·	2.3 km	MPC · JPL
628817	2016 EL_{258}	—	March 14, 2016	Mount Lemmon	Mount Lemmon Survey	·	2.0 km	MPC · JPL
628818	2016 FJ_{12}	—	June 17, 2010	Mount Lemmon	Mount Lemmon Survey	·	560 m	MPC · JPL
628819	2016 FQ_{30}	—	January 14, 2015	Haleakala	Pan-STARRS 1	·	2.1 km	MPC · JPL
628820	2016 FK_{32}	—	May 4, 2005	Mount Lemmon	Mount Lemmon Survey	HYG	2.3 km	MPC · JPL
628821	2016 FY_{36}	—	April 30, 2011	Mount Lemmon	Mount Lemmon Survey	·	1.9 km	MPC · JPL
628822	2016 FO_{46}	—	March 27, 2011	Kitt Peak	Spacewatch	·	1.9 km	MPC · JPL
628823	2016 FY_{50}	—	April 17, 2005	Kitt Peak	Spacewatch	·	2.7 km	MPC · JPL
628824	2016 FJ_{65}	—	November 1, 2008	Mount Lemmon	Mount Lemmon Survey	EOS	1.6 km	MPC · JPL
628825	2016 GB_{18}	—	September 18, 2003	Kitt Peak	Spacewatch	·	1.3 km	MPC · JPL
628826	2016 GX_{18}	—	November 27, 2014	Mount Lemmon	Mount Lemmon Survey	·	1.9 km	MPC · JPL
628827	2016 GC_{20}	—	March 24, 2006	Mount Lemmon	Mount Lemmon Survey	·	1.4 km	MPC · JPL
628828	2016 GK_{27}	—	January 13, 2015	Haleakala	Pan-STARRS 1	·	1.8 km	MPC · JPL
628829	2016 GW_{27}	—	March 8, 2005	Mount Lemmon	Mount Lemmon Survey	·	2.3 km	MPC · JPL
628830	2016 GF_{45}	—	January 16, 2004	Kitt Peak	Spacewatch	·	2.2 km	MPC · JPL
628831	2016 GO_{152}	—	October 12, 2013	Kitt Peak	Spacewatch	·	2.3 km	MPC · JPL
628832	2016 GY_{152}	—	April 30, 2011	Mount Lemmon	Mount Lemmon Survey	THM	1.9 km	MPC · JPL
628833	2016 GA_{201}	—	December 29, 2014	Haleakala	Pan-STARRS 1	·	2.7 km	MPC · JPL
628834	2016 GC_{213}	—	November 8, 2013	Mount Lemmon	Mount Lemmon Survey	THM	1.8 km	MPC · JPL
628835	2016 GC_{285}	—	April 2, 2016	Mount Lemmon	Mount Lemmon Survey	·	1.7 km	MPC · JPL
628836	2016 JO_{27}	—	November 9, 2013	Mount Lemmon	Mount Lemmon Survey	EOS	1.6 km	MPC · JPL
628837	2016 JP_{41}	—	March 19, 2016	Haleakala	Pan-STARRS 1	·	2.4 km	MPC · JPL
628838	2016 JQ_{48}	—	May 7, 2016	Haleakala	Pan-STARRS 1	·	490 m	MPC · JPL
628839	2016 NF_{6}	—	October 2, 2006	Mount Lemmon	Mount Lemmon Survey	·	540 m	MPC · JPL
628840	2016 NZ_{11}	—	September 17, 2006	Kitt Peak	Spacewatch	·	600 m	MPC · JPL
628841	2016 NH_{20}	—	April 3, 2016	Haleakala	Pan-STARRS 1	·	610 m	MPC · JPL
628842	2016 NW_{35}	—	September 3, 2013	Kitt Peak	Spacewatch	·	530 m	MPC · JPL
628843	2016 NE_{107}	—	July 6, 2016	Haleakala	Pan-STARRS 1	·	520 m	MPC · JPL
628844	2016 NY_{107}	—	July 13, 2016	Mount Lemmon	Mount Lemmon Survey	·	550 m	MPC · JPL
628845	2016 PK_{116}	—	February 13, 2008	Kitt Peak	Spacewatch	·	570 m	MPC · JPL
628846	2016 QF_{1}	—	August 5, 2012	Haleakala	Pan-STARRS 1	·	1.2 km	MPC · JPL
628847	2016 QQ_{3}	—	July 31, 2009	Kitt Peak	Spacewatch	·	580 m	MPC · JPL
628848	2016 QB_{7}	—	December 4, 2013	Haleakala	Pan-STARRS 1	·	520 m	MPC · JPL
628849	2016 QE_{14}	—	July 14, 2009	Kitt Peak	Spacewatch	·	530 m	MPC · JPL
628850	2016 QN_{20}	—	October 25, 2013	Kitt Peak	Spacewatch	·	710 m	MPC · JPL
628851	2016 QO_{27}	—	August 13, 2016	Haleakala	Pan-STARRS 1	·	820 m	MPC · JPL
628852	2016 QH_{69}	—	January 21, 2014	Haleakala	Pan-STARRS 1	·	800 m	MPC · JPL
628853	2016 RL_{21}	—	July 9, 2016	Kitt Peak	Spacewatch	·	570 m	MPC · JPL
628854	2016 RA_{28}	—	August 15, 2009	Kitt Peak	Spacewatch	·	760 m	MPC · JPL
628855	2016 RW_{64}	—	September 12, 2016	Haleakala	Pan-STARRS 1	·	710 m	MPC · JPL
628856	2016 SP_{14}	—	November 9, 2009	Kitt Peak	Spacewatch	NYS	890 m	MPC · JPL
628857	2016 TP_{17}	—	September 30, 1973	Palomar	C. J. van Houten, I. van Houten-Groeneveld, T. Gehrels	·	860 m	MPC · JPL
628858	2016 TN_{91}	—	September 29, 2005	Kitt Peak	Spacewatch	·	770 m	MPC · JPL
628859	2016 TU_{97}	—	November 30, 2005	Kitt Peak	Spacewatch	MAS	600 m	MPC · JPL
628860	2016 UN_{33}	—	December 18, 2001	Socorro	LINEAR	NYS	1.0 km	MPC · JPL
628861	2016 UX_{54}	—	December 28, 2005	Kitt Peak	Spacewatch	NYS	1.0 km	MPC · JPL
628862	2016 UG_{78}	—	November 17, 2008	Kitt Peak	Spacewatch	3:2	3.9 km	MPC · JPL
628863	2016 UQ_{102}	—	December 30, 2005	Mount Lemmon	Mount Lemmon Survey	V	570 m	MPC · JPL
628864	2016 UH_{124}	—	November 6, 2005	Mount Lemmon	Mount Lemmon Survey	·	920 m	MPC · JPL
628865	2016 UB_{137}	—	March 26, 2007	Kitt Peak	Spacewatch	MAS	630 m	MPC · JPL
628866	2016 VB_{10}	—	November 20, 2009	Mount Lemmon	Mount Lemmon Survey	3:2	3.7 km	MPC · JPL
628867	2016 VQ_{18}	—	November 26, 2009	Catalina	CSS	·	1.2 km	MPC · JPL
628868	2016 VS_{31}	—	November 10, 2016	Haleakala	Pan-STARRS 1	·	1.2 km	MPC · JPL
628869	2016 WK_{4}	—	October 16, 2001	Kitt Peak	Spacewatch	·	850 m	MPC · JPL
628870	2016 WC_{16}	—	August 12, 2012	Siding Spring	SSS	NYS	1.0 km	MPC · JPL
628871	2016 WL_{17}	—	December 9, 2004	Kitt Peak	Spacewatch	·	980 m	MPC · JPL
628872	2016 WZ_{28}	—	September 3, 2008	Kitt Peak	Spacewatch	V	530 m	MPC · JPL
628873	2016 WL_{34}	—	March 20, 2015	Haleakala	Pan-STARRS 1	H	410 m	MPC · JPL
628874	2016 WU_{48}	—	October 27, 2005	Kitt Peak	Spacewatch	·	790 m	MPC · JPL
628875	2016 WS_{49}	—	October 7, 2005	Kitt Peak	Spacewatch	·	570 m	MPC · JPL
628876	2016 XT_{5}	—	August 29, 2005	Palomar	NEAT	V	850 m	MPC · JPL
628877	2016 XY_{8}	—	August 14, 2012	Haleakala	Pan-STARRS 1	·	950 m	MPC · JPL
628878	2016 XU_{11}	—	October 2, 2008	Mount Lemmon	Mount Lemmon Survey	NYS	790 m	MPC · JPL
628879	2016 XU_{15}	—	January 28, 2009	Catalina	CSS	·	1.2 km	MPC · JPL
628880	2017 AK_{12}	—	October 26, 2000	Kitt Peak	Spacewatch	·	1.1 km	MPC · JPL
628881	2017 AC_{46}	—	September 9, 2015	Haleakala	Pan-STARRS 1	·	1.2 km	MPC · JPL
628882	2017 BP_{18}	—	January 30, 2009	Mount Lemmon	Mount Lemmon Survey	·	830 m	MPC · JPL
628883	2017 BC_{22}	—	February 25, 2006	Mount Lemmon	Mount Lemmon Survey	NYS	1.3 km	MPC · JPL
628884	2017 BP_{36}	—	December 1, 2003	Socorro	LINEAR	·	1.4 km	MPC · JPL
628885	2017 BK_{40}	—	May 9, 2005	Mount Lemmon	Mount Lemmon Survey	·	1.3 km	MPC · JPL
628886	2017 BE_{45}	—	January 10, 2013	Haleakala	Pan-STARRS 1	MAR	1.1 km	MPC · JPL
628887	2017 BL_{45}	—	January 19, 2013	Kitt Peak	Spacewatch	·	910 m	MPC · JPL
628888	2017 BJ_{52}	—	January 18, 2008	Mount Lemmon	Mount Lemmon Survey	·	1.9 km	MPC · JPL
628889	2017 BO_{70}	—	September 10, 2007	Kitt Peak	Spacewatch	·	870 m	MPC · JPL
628890	2017 BU_{83}	—	March 15, 2004	Socorro	LINEAR	·	1.7 km	MPC · JPL
628891	2017 BC_{91}	—	August 26, 2012	Haleakala	Pan-STARRS 1	L5	8.6 km	MPC · JPL
628892	2017 BQ_{105}	—	September 14, 2007	Mount Lemmon	Mount Lemmon Survey	MAR	600 m	MPC · JPL
628893	2017 BY_{113}	—	November 9, 1999	Kitt Peak	Spacewatch	MAR	910 m	MPC · JPL
628894	2017 BP_{126}	—	December 21, 2008	Mount Lemmon	Mount Lemmon Survey	·	1.0 km	MPC · JPL
628895	2017 BA_{140}	—	January 26, 2012	Mount Lemmon	Mount Lemmon Survey	·	1.6 km	MPC · JPL
628896	2017 BP_{152}	—	January 27, 2017	Haleakala	Pan-STARRS 1	HNS	820 m	MPC · JPL
628897	2017 CL_{3}	—	March 31, 2009	Kitt Peak	Spacewatch	·	1.1 km	MPC · JPL
628898	2017 CE_{24}	—	November 12, 1999	Kitt Peak	Spacewatch	·	770 m	MPC · JPL
628899	2017 CC_{34}	—	December 31, 2013	Haleakala	Pan-STARRS 1	H	480 m	MPC · JPL
628900	2017 CJ_{34}	—	February 6, 2007	Mount Lemmon	Mount Lemmon Survey	·	2.2 km	MPC · JPL

== 628901–629000 ==
back to top

Designation			Discovery			Properties		Ref
Permanent	Provisional	Named after	Date	Site	Discoverer(s)	Category	Diam.	Ref
628901	2017 DQ_{4}	—	October 23, 2011	Mount Lemmon	Mount Lemmon Survey	(5)	810 m	MPC · JPL
628902	2017 DR_{11}	—	September 14, 2006	Catalina	CSS	·	1.4 km	MPC · JPL
628903	2017 DW_{23}	—	October 21, 2003	Kitt Peak	Spacewatch	(5)	1.1 km	MPC · JPL
628904	2017 DS_{24}	—	September 3, 2010	Mount Lemmon	Mount Lemmon Survey	·	1.5 km	MPC · JPL
628905	2017 DN_{25}	—	September 23, 2015	Haleakala	Pan-STARRS 1	·	1.6 km	MPC · JPL
628906	2017 DA_{31}	—	November 3, 2008	Mount Lemmon	Mount Lemmon Survey	·	1.1 km	MPC · JPL
628907	2017 DX_{42}	—	October 9, 2004	Kitt Peak	Spacewatch	·	880 m	MPC · JPL
628908	2017 DF_{50}	—	August 14, 2015	Haleakala	Pan-STARRS 1	·	780 m	MPC · JPL
628909	2017 DX_{70}	—	November 24, 2011	Haleakala	Pan-STARRS 1	·	1.5 km	MPC · JPL
628910	2017 DY_{70}	—	August 19, 2006	Kitt Peak	Spacewatch	·	1.1 km	MPC · JPL
628911	2017 DB_{75}	—	October 2, 2006	Kitt Peak	Spacewatch	·	1.5 km	MPC · JPL
628912	2017 DO_{79}	—	October 16, 2003	Palomar	NEAT	·	1.4 km	MPC · JPL
628913	2017 DW_{86}	—	October 25, 2011	Haleakala	Pan-STARRS 1	·	1.0 km	MPC · JPL
628914	2017 DP_{87}	—	January 5, 2002	Linz	E. Meyer	·	2.1 km	MPC · JPL
628915	2017 DW_{93}	—	October 4, 2011	Piszkéstető	K. Sárneczky	·	1.3 km	MPC · JPL
628916	2017 DU_{97}	—	November 14, 2006	Mount Lemmon	Mount Lemmon Survey	·	1.4 km	MPC · JPL
628917	2017 DW_{113}	—	March 6, 2013	Haleakala	Pan-STARRS 1	HNS	870 m	MPC · JPL
628918	2017 DZ_{116}	—	April 18, 2009	Kitt Peak	Spacewatch	·	1.6 km	MPC · JPL
628919	2017 DA_{122}	—	October 19, 2006	Kitt Peak	Spacewatch	·	1.3 km	MPC · JPL
628920	2017 DH_{122}	—	February 1, 2012	Kitt Peak	Spacewatch	PAD	1.4 km	MPC · JPL
628921	2017 EJ_{14}	—	March 28, 2008	Kitt Peak	Spacewatch	·	1.6 km	MPC · JPL
628922	2017 EK_{16}	—	September 24, 2015	Catalina	CSS	·	1.5 km	MPC · JPL
628923	2017 EQ_{16}	—	September 11, 2010	Kitt Peak	Spacewatch	·	1.6 km	MPC · JPL
628924	2017 EH_{22}	—	April 4, 2008	Catalina	CSS	·	1.9 km	MPC · JPL
628925	2017 FZ_{4}	—	November 8, 2007	Mount Lemmon	Mount Lemmon Survey	·	1.0 km	MPC · JPL
628926	2017 FU_{6}	—	March 4, 2017	Haleakala	Pan-STARRS 1	·	1.3 km	MPC · JPL
628927	2017 FD_{9}	—	December 22, 2006	Piszkéstető	K. Sárneczky, Szulagyi, J.	·	2.2 km	MPC · JPL
628928	2017 FW_{20}	—	October 24, 2011	Haleakala	Pan-STARRS 1	·	850 m	MPC · JPL
628929	2017 FV_{29}	—	March 2, 2008	Kitt Peak	Spacewatch	·	1.2 km	MPC · JPL
628930	2017 FV_{30}	—	March 31, 2008	Mount Lemmon	Mount Lemmon Survey	·	1.4 km	MPC · JPL
628931	2017 FA_{47}	—	September 19, 2006	Catalina	CSS	·	1.6 km	MPC · JPL
628932	2017 FZ_{60}	—	May 4, 2000	Apache Point	SDSS	EUN	940 m	MPC · JPL
628933	2017 FX_{73}	—	August 19, 2006	Kitt Peak	Spacewatch	·	1.4 km	MPC · JPL
628934	2017 FM_{94}	—	January 11, 2008	Mount Lemmon	Mount Lemmon Survey	·	1.4 km	MPC · JPL
628935	2017 FL_{99}	—	August 15, 2009	Kitt Peak	Spacewatch	·	2.1 km	MPC · JPL
628936	2017 FW_{104}	—	February 22, 2007	Mount Lemmon	Mount Lemmon Survey	GEF	1.2 km	MPC · JPL
628937	2017 FZ_{105}	—	August 29, 2005	Kitt Peak	Spacewatch	·	1.5 km	MPC · JPL
628938	2017 FG_{114}	—	May 5, 2008	Mount Lemmon	Mount Lemmon Survey	·	1.4 km	MPC · JPL
628939	2017 FL_{124}	—	January 31, 2009	Kitt Peak	Spacewatch	·	880 m	MPC · JPL
628940	2017 FU_{125}	—	May 31, 2006	Mount Lemmon	Mount Lemmon Survey	·	530 m	MPC · JPL
628941	2017 FF_{137}	—	February 7, 2008	Kitt Peak	Spacewatch	·	1.1 km	MPC · JPL
628942	2017 FX_{157}	—	November 18, 2011	Kitt Peak	Spacewatch	·	1.3 km	MPC · JPL
628943	2017 FR_{167}	—	November 11, 2010	Mount Lemmon	Mount Lemmon Survey	·	2.0 km	MPC · JPL
628944	2017 GZ	—	August 3, 2014	Haleakala	Pan-STARRS 1	ADE	1.6 km	MPC · JPL
628945	2017 GZ_{6}	—	February 12, 2008	Mount Lemmon	Mount Lemmon Survey	·	1.7 km	MPC · JPL
628946	2017 GU_{9}	—	January 22, 2002	Kitt Peak	Spacewatch	HOF	2.1 km	MPC · JPL
628947	2017 HE_{13}	—	March 31, 2008	Mount Lemmon	Mount Lemmon Survey	·	1.3 km	MPC · JPL
628948	2017 HG_{58}	—	April 20, 2017	Haleakala	Pan-STARRS 1	KOR	1.0 km	MPC · JPL
628949	2017 HN_{62}	—	March 27, 2012	Kitt Peak	Spacewatch	·	1.6 km	MPC · JPL
628950	2017 HG_{68}	—	October 3, 2014	Kitt Peak	Spacewatch	·	1.5 km	MPC · JPL
628951	2017 KL	—	September 20, 2014	Haleakala	Pan-STARRS 1	·	1.5 km	MPC · JPL
628952	2017 NV	—	September 16, 2012	Mayhill-ISON	L. Elenin	EUP	2.8 km	MPC · JPL
628953	2017 OY_{25}	—	March 27, 2003	Kitt Peak	Spacewatch	EUP	3.3 km	MPC · JPL
628954	2017 OT_{38}	—	January 19, 2015	Mount Lemmon	Mount Lemmon Survey	·	900 m	MPC · JPL
628955	2017 QW_{12}	—	January 21, 2015	Haleakala	Pan-STARRS 1	·	2.3 km	MPC · JPL
628956	2017 QX_{62}	—	September 17, 2012	Mount Lemmon	Mount Lemmon Survey	·	2.4 km	MPC · JPL
628957	2017 QA_{140}	—	October 21, 2012	Mount Lemmon	Mount Lemmon Survey	·	2.5 km	MPC · JPL
628958	2017 UQ_{15}	—	September 29, 2010	Mount Lemmon	Mount Lemmon Survey	·	640 m	MPC · JPL
628959	2017 XQ_{19}	—	October 28, 2017	Mount Lemmon	Mount Lemmon Survey	·	450 m	MPC · JPL
628960	2017 YR_{28}	—	December 25, 2017	Mount Lemmon	Mount Lemmon Survey	·	1.1 km	MPC · JPL
628961	2018 CY_{11}	—	March 2, 2014	Haleakala	Pan-STARRS 1	PHO	1.0 km	MPC · JPL
628962	2018 ET	—	February 10, 2014	Haleakala	Pan-STARRS 1	·	1.2 km	MPC · JPL
628963	2018 FB_{27}	—	September 9, 2015	Haleakala	Pan-STARRS 1	·	730 m	MPC · JPL
628964	2018 PL_{6}	—	September 27, 2003	Kitt Peak	Spacewatch	·	1.2 km	MPC · JPL
628965	2018 PQ_{13}	—	November 4, 2005	Kitt Peak	Spacewatch	·	1.5 km	MPC · JPL
628966	2018 PL_{26}	—	September 21, 2003	Kitt Peak	Spacewatch	EOS	1.6 km	MPC · JPL
628967	2018 PK_{60}	—	August 6, 2018	Haleakala	Pan-STARRS 1	·	1.9 km	MPC · JPL
628968	2018 SK_{8}	—	September 5, 2007	Mount Lemmon	Mount Lemmon Survey	·	2.7 km	MPC · JPL
628969	2018 UF_{11}	—	November 27, 2013	Haleakala	Pan-STARRS 1	·	2.8 km	MPC · JPL
628970	2018 VD_{2}	—	September 19, 2007	Kitt Peak	Spacewatch	H	390 m	MPC · JPL
628971	2018 VS_{12}	—	October 10, 2007	Kitt Peak	Spacewatch	·	2.3 km	MPC · JPL
628972	2018 VU_{25}	—	August 22, 2012	Haleakala	Pan-STARRS 1	·	2.4 km	MPC · JPL
628973	2018 VC_{30}	—	September 20, 2012	Bergisch Gladbach	W. Bickel	·	2.4 km	MPC · JPL
628974	2018 VK_{34}	—	November 13, 2007	Kitt Peak	Spacewatch	THM	1.7 km	MPC · JPL
628975	2018 VK_{63}	—	November 27, 2013	Haleakala	Pan-STARRS 1	·	2.2 km	MPC · JPL
628976	2018 VW_{66}	—	November 6, 2013	Haleakala	Pan-STARRS 1	EOS	1.8 km	MPC · JPL
628977	2018 VY_{86}	—	February 5, 2014	Catalina	CSS	·	2.5 km	MPC · JPL
628978	2018 VX_{90}	—	September 21, 2012	Mount Lemmon	Mount Lemmon Survey	·	2.4 km	MPC · JPL
628979	2018 VO_{95}	—	September 14, 2006	Kitt Peak	Spacewatch	·	2.2 km	MPC · JPL
628980	2018 VE_{109}	—	February 25, 2015	Haleakala	Pan-STARRS 1	EOS	1.4 km	MPC · JPL
628981	2018 VM_{119}	—	May 25, 2015	Haleakala	Pan-STARRS 1	·	3.0 km	MPC · JPL
628982	2018 WQ_{8}	—	November 12, 2007	Mount Lemmon	Mount Lemmon Survey	·	2.4 km	MPC · JPL
628983	2018 XP_{14}	—	August 1, 2017	Haleakala	Pan-STARRS 1	T_{j} (2.99)	2.2 km	MPC · JPL
628984	2018 XR_{18}	—	January 3, 2014	Catalina	CSS	·	2.1 km	MPC · JPL
628985	2019 AH_{32}	—	February 28, 2009	Kitt Peak	Spacewatch	·	2.6 km	MPC · JPL
628986	2019 AS_{49}	—	January 12, 2019	Haleakala	Pan-STARRS 1	·	580 m	MPC · JPL
628987	2019 CG_{1}	—	January 12, 2008	Kitt Peak	Spacewatch	H	420 m	MPC · JPL
628988	2019 GW_{11}	—	May 19, 2012	Mount Lemmon	Mount Lemmon Survey	·	750 m	MPC · JPL
628989	2019 JF_{39}	—	March 24, 2012	Mount Lemmon	Mount Lemmon Survey	·	500 m	MPC · JPL
628990	2019 KV_{8}	—	April 13, 2008	Kitt Peak	Spacewatch	·	750 m	MPC · JPL
628991	2019 PC_{33}	—	August 8, 2019	Haleakala	Pan-STARRS 2	(17392)	1.1 km	MPC · JPL
628992	2019 QO_{30}	—	August 21, 2019	Mount Lemmon	Mount Lemmon Survey	·	850 m	MPC · JPL
628993	2019 SL_{1}	—	January 30, 2012	Kitt Peak	Spacewatch	·	920 m	MPC · JPL
628994	2019 SQ_{24}	—	November 26, 2011	Mount Lemmon	Mount Lemmon Survey	(5)	930 m	MPC · JPL
628995	2019 SF_{149}	—	March 29, 2008	Mount Lemmon	Mount Lemmon Survey	·	1.0 km	MPC · JPL
628996	2019 UD_{1}	—	July 4, 2014	Haleakala	Pan-STARRS 1	·	1.1 km	MPC · JPL
628997	2019 UY_{14}	—	October 27, 2006	Catalina	CSS	·	1.0 km	MPC · JPL
628998	2019 UY_{44}	—	August 22, 2014	Haleakala	Pan-STARRS 1	·	1.3 km	MPC · JPL
628999	2019 XJ_{4}	—	November 1, 2018	Mount Lemmon	Mount Lemmon Survey	·	2.5 km	MPC · JPL
629000	2019 YT_{42}	—	October 7, 2007	Mount Lemmon	Mount Lemmon Survey	VER	2.0 km	MPC · JPL

back to top

== Meaning of names ==
As minor planet discoveries are confirmed, they are given a permanent number by the IAU's Minor Planet Center (MPC), and the discoverers can then submit names for them, following the IAU's naming conventions. The list below concerns those minor planets in the specified number-range that have received names, and explains the meanings of those names.

Official naming citations of newly named small Solar System bodies are approved and published in a bulletin by IAU's Working Group for Small Bodies Nomenclature (WGSBN). Before May 2021, citations were published in MPC's Minor Planet Circulars for many decades. Recent citations can also be found on the JPL Small-Body Database (SBDB). Until his death in 2016, German astronomer Lutz D. Schmadel compiled these citations into the Dictionary of Minor Planet Names (DMP) and regularly updated the collection.

Based on Paul Herget's The Names of the Minor Planets, Schmadel also researched the unclear origin of numerous asteroids, most of which had been named prior to World War II. This article incorporates text from this source, which is in the public domain: SBDB New namings may only be added to this list below after official publication as the preannouncement of names is condemned. The WGSBN publishes a comprehensive guideline for the naming rules of non-cometary small Solar System bodies.

Named minor planet	Provisional	This minor planet was named for...	Ref · Catalog
628318 Stevemould	2014 TB_{76}	Steve Mould (born 1978), British educational YouTuber and science presenter with over three million subscribers.	IAU · 628318
