= Numberphile =

UK educational YouTube web series (2011–present)

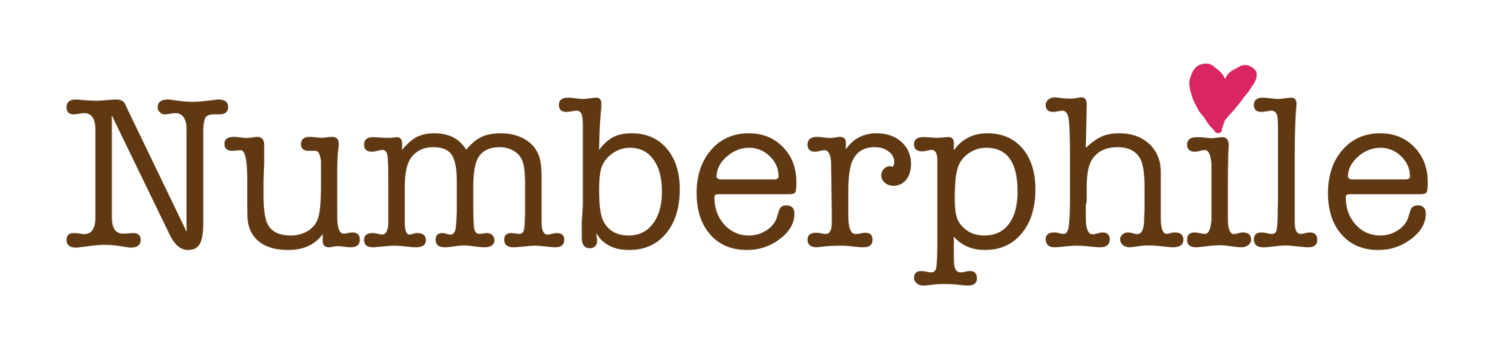
- The logo of the channel

YouTube information
- Channel: Numberphile
- Years active: 2011–present
- Genre: Educational entertainment
- Subscribers: 4.79 million
- Views: 742 million
- Last updated: 1 November 2026
- Website: Official website

Numberphile is an educational YouTube channel and web series featuring videos that explore topics from a variety of fields of mathematics. In the early days of the channel, each video focused on a specific number, but the series has since expanded its scope, featuring videos on more advanced mathematical concepts such as Fermat's Last Theorem, the Riemann hypothesis and Kruskal's tree theorem. The videos are produced by Brady Haran, a former BBC video journalist and creator of Periodic Videos, Sixty Symbols, and several other YouTube channels. Videos on the channel feature several university professors, maths communicators and famous mathematicians.

In 2018, Haran released a spin-off audio podcast titled The Numberphile Podcast.

== YouTube channel ==
The Numberphile YouTube channel was started on 15 September 2011. Most videos consist of Haran interviewing an expert on a number, mathematical theorem or other mathematical concept. The expert usually draws out their explanation on a large piece of brown paper and attempts to make the concepts understandable to the average, non-mathematician viewer. It is supported by the Mathematical Sciences Research Institute (MSRI) and Math for America. Haran also runs the Numberphile2 channel, which includes extra footage and further detail than the main channel. The channel also occasionally covers major mathematical events; for example, in 2026, Haran went behind the scenes at the Abel Prize ceremonies in Norway to interview laureate Gerd Faltings.

=== Reception ===
Numberphile consistently rates among the top YouTube channels in maths and education. The channel was nominated for a Shorty Award in Education in 2016. The New York Times said that, "at Numberphile, mathematicians discourse, enthusiastically and winningly, on numbers", and The Independent described the channel as "insanely popular". The Sunday Times said, "The mathematical stars of social media, such as James Grime and Matt Parker, entertain legions of fans with striking videos demonstrating how powerful and playful maths can be."

New Scientist listed Numberphile as one of the top ten science channels on YouTube in 2019.

In 2024, Brady Haran was awarded the Christopher Zeeman Medal, recognising excellence in the communication of mathematics for his work, including Numberphile.

=== Contributors ===
Numberphile has hosted a wide array of mathematicians, computer scientists, scientists and science writers, including:

- Federico Ardila
- Johnny Ball
- Alex Bellos
- Elwyn Berlekamp
- Andrew Booker
- Steven Bradlow
- Timothy Browning
- Brian Butterworth
- John Conway
- Ed Copeland
- Tom Crawford
- Zsuzsanna Dancso
- Persi Diaconis
- Marcus Du Sautoy
- Rob Eastaway
- Laurence Eaves
- David Eisenbud
- Richard Elwes
- Edward Frenkel
- Hannah Fry
- Lisa Goldberg
- Ron Graham
- James Grime
- Edmund Harriss
- Gordon Hamilton
- Tim Harford
- Don Knuth
- Holly Krieger
- James Maynard
- Barry Mazur
- Steve Mould
- Colm Mulcahy
- Tony Padilla
- Simon Pampena
- Matt Parker
- Roger Penrose
- Carl Pomerance
- Ken Ribet
- Tom Scott
- Henry Segerman
- Carlo H. Séquin
- Jim Simons
- Simon Singh
- Neil Sloane
- Ben Sparks
- Katie Steckles
- Zvezdelina Stankova
- Clifford Stoll
- Terence Tao
- Tadashi Tokieda
- Mariel Vázquez
- Cédric Villani
- Zandra Vinegar
- Grant Sanderson
- Ayliean MacDonald
- Matt Henderson
- Sophie Maclean
- Simon Anthony
- Jared Duker Lichtman
- Isabel Vogt

== The Numberphile Podcast ==
The Numberphile Podcast
- Genre: Interview
- Language: English

Cast and voices
- Hosted by: Brady Haran

Production
- Length: 21–75 minutes

Publication
- Original release: 4 November 2018

Related
- Related shows: Hello Internet; The Unmade Podcast
- Website: www.numberphile.com/podcast

Haran started a podcast titled The Numberphile Podcast in 2018 as a sister project. The podcast focuses more heavily on the lives and personalities of the subjects of the videos.

No.	Title	Run Time	Original release date
1	"The Hope Diamond – with 3Blue1Brown"	1:03:20	4 November 2018
2	"Fermat’s Last Theorem – with Ken Ribet"	48:22	21 November 2018
3	"Delicious Problems – with Hannah Fry"	52:00	16 December 2018
4	"The Klein Bottle Guy – with Cliff Stoll"	59:08	8 January 2019
5	"The Math Storyteller – with Simon Singh"	1:11:36	11 February 2019
6	"Parker Square – with Matt Parker"	52:04	24 February 2019
7	"A Proof in the Drawer – with David Eisenbud"	1:15:20	7 April 2019
8	"The Offensive Lineman – with John Urschel"	36:43	14 May 2019
9	"The Singing Banana – with James Grime"	1:13:21	20 May 2019
10	"The C-Word – talking Calculus with Steven Strogatz"	51:17	17 June 2019
11	"The Number Collector – with Neil Sloane"	55:36	14 August 2019
12	"Fame and Admiration – with Timothy Gowers"	54:25	22 October 2019
13	"The Badly Behaved Prime – with James Maynard"	41:38	10 November 2019
14	"Coffin Problems – with Edward Frenkel"	1:21:39	3 December 2019
15	"Champaign Mathematician – with Holly Krieger"	40:00	13 December 2019
16	"Gondor Calls for Aid – with Kit Yates"	28:18	31 March 2020
17	"Crystal Balls and Coronavirus – with Hannah Fry"	44:55	10 April 2020
18	"The Legendary John Conway (1937–2020)"	38:01	13 April 2020
19	"The Accidental Streamer – with 3Blue1Brown"	33:05	19 April 2020
20	"The Parker Quiz – with Matt Parker"	55:34	21 May 2020
21	"The Happy Twin – with Ben Sparks"	1:02:21	27 May 2020
22	"The Numeracy Ambassador – with Simon Pampena"	1:00:15	1 July 2020
23	"The Mathematical Showman – Ron Graham (1935–2020)"	39:02	13 July 2020
24	"The Third Cornet – with Katie Steckles"	59:49	24 July 2020
25	"Why Did the Mathematician Cross the Road? – with Roger Penrose"	1:05:16	8 August 2020
26	"The Importance of Numbers – with Tim Harford"	47:29	12 September 2020
27	"Nursery Rhymes and Numbers – with Alan Stewart"	54:06	5 October 2020
28	"Quiz Shows and Math Anxiety – with Bobby Seagull"	1:24:26	23 October 2020
29	"Club Automatic – with Alex Bellos"	54:17	25 November 2020
30	"Why Study Mathematics – with Vicky Neale"	45:11	8 December 2020
31	"Statistics and Saving Lives – with Jennifer Rogers"	55:50	11 December 2020
32	"Rockstar Epidemiologists – with Adam Kucharski"	45:10	2 February 2021
33	"The High Jumping Cosmologist – with Katie Mack"	54:53	25 February 2021
34	"Beauty in the Messiness – with Philip Moriarty"	39:05	3 April 2021
35	"The Naked Mathematician – with Tom Crawford"	58:12	31 May 2021
36	"A Chance at Immortality – with Marcus du Sautoy"	51:29	26 July 2021
37	"Making Sense of Infinity – with Asaf Karagila"	53:27	28 August 2021
38	"Google's 'DeepMind' does Mathematics"	37:02	2 December 2021
39	"The Little Star – with Zvezdelina Stankova"	58:20	14 January 2022
40	"An Infinite Debt – with Christopher Havens (Prisoner #349034)"	49:50	13 February 2022
41	"The First and Last Digits of Pi"	42:26	14 March 2022
42	"A Passion for Big Numbers (and Liverpool FC) – with Tony Padilla"	50:41	18 April 2022
43	"The Orchid Room and Cancer – with Hannah Fry"	36:51	29 May 2022
44	"An Educated Adult – with Tadashi Tokieda"	1:13:45	11 July 2022
45	"Finding a Path – with Tatiana Toro"	43:39	13 December 2022
46	"A Chain of Chance – with Michael Merrifield"	1:06:17	18 January 2023
47	"An A-Class Reject – with Ed Copeland"	1:04:18	22 February 2023
48	"Yes, I accept the Fields Medal – with James Maynard"	27:59	3 August 2023
49	"Finding Your Place – with Federico Ardila"	54:57	23 August 2023
50	"The Math of Movies – with Walt Hickey"	51:24	12 October 2023
51	"A Very Bad Estimator – with Donald Knuth"	54:26	16 January 2024
52	"The Hyper-Curious Billionaire – Jim Simons (1938–2024)"	37:50	6 June 2024
53	"Winnie the Math Whiz – with Danica McKellar"	45:19	2 July 2024
54	"The Secret Math Journal – with Ellen Eischen"	53:45	30 July 2024
55	"The Largest Known Prime Number"	39:40	24 October 2024
56	"Counting Crayons – with Po-Ling Loh"	39:25	14 December 2024
57	"The Indecisive Statistics Professor – with Chris Oates"	47:56	15 July 2025
58	"Everything You Wanted to Know About Numberphile – with Brady Haran"	59:49	29 August 2025
59	"Making Math Videos in Ukraine – with Sashko Olenchenko"	50:50	9 November 2025
60	"The storm is coming – with Hugo Duminil-Copin"	34:28	21 January 2026
61	"The Man Who Loves Weather – with Chief Meteorologist Dan Harris"	57:04	18 March 2026
62	"Rockets, Religion & Rejection – with Destin Sandlin from Smarter Every Day"	1:06:13	26 March 2026
63	"To SAT, or not SAT, that is the question"	37:33	11 August 2026
64	"The Glimmer in our Eye – with Grant Sanderson from 3Blue1Brown"	57:12	28 September 2026
65	"The Strip Mining of Mathematical Proofs – with Hugo Duminil-Copin"	33:00	14 October 2026
66	"No More Heroes – Terry Tao on AI in Mathematics"	21:00	15 October 2026
