= Eastaway =

Eastaway is a surname. Notable people with the surname include:

- Bob Eastaway (born 1943), Australian rules footballer
- Rob Eastaway (active from 1992), English author who is active in the popularisation of mathematics
