= Hello Internet =

Discussion podcast by Brady Haran and CGP Grey

- Genre: Discussion
- Language: English

Cast and voices
- Hosted by: CGP Grey; Brady Haran

Music
- Theme music composed by: Alan Stewart

Production
- Length: 38–169 minutes

Technical specifications
- Audio format: MP3; Vinyl (two-time special); Wax cylinder (one-time special)

Publication
- No. of episodes: 133 (as of May 2020) plus 18 special episodes
- Original release: 31 January 2014 – 28 February 2020 (on hiatus)
- Updates: approx. twice per month; on hiatus since May 2020

Related
- Related shows: Cortex; The Unmade Podcast; The Numberphile Podcast
- Website: www.hellointernet.fm

Hello Internet is an audio podcast hosted by educational YouTube content creators Brady Haran and CGP Grey. The podcast debuted in 2014 and released 136 numbered episodes and 18 unnumbered episodes until February 2020, when the last episode was published. The podcast is currently indefinitely suspended and inactive. Listeners of the podcast are known as "Tims". The episodes of the podcast are usually about the interests of the creators and the differences between the hosts' lifestyles.

== Content ==
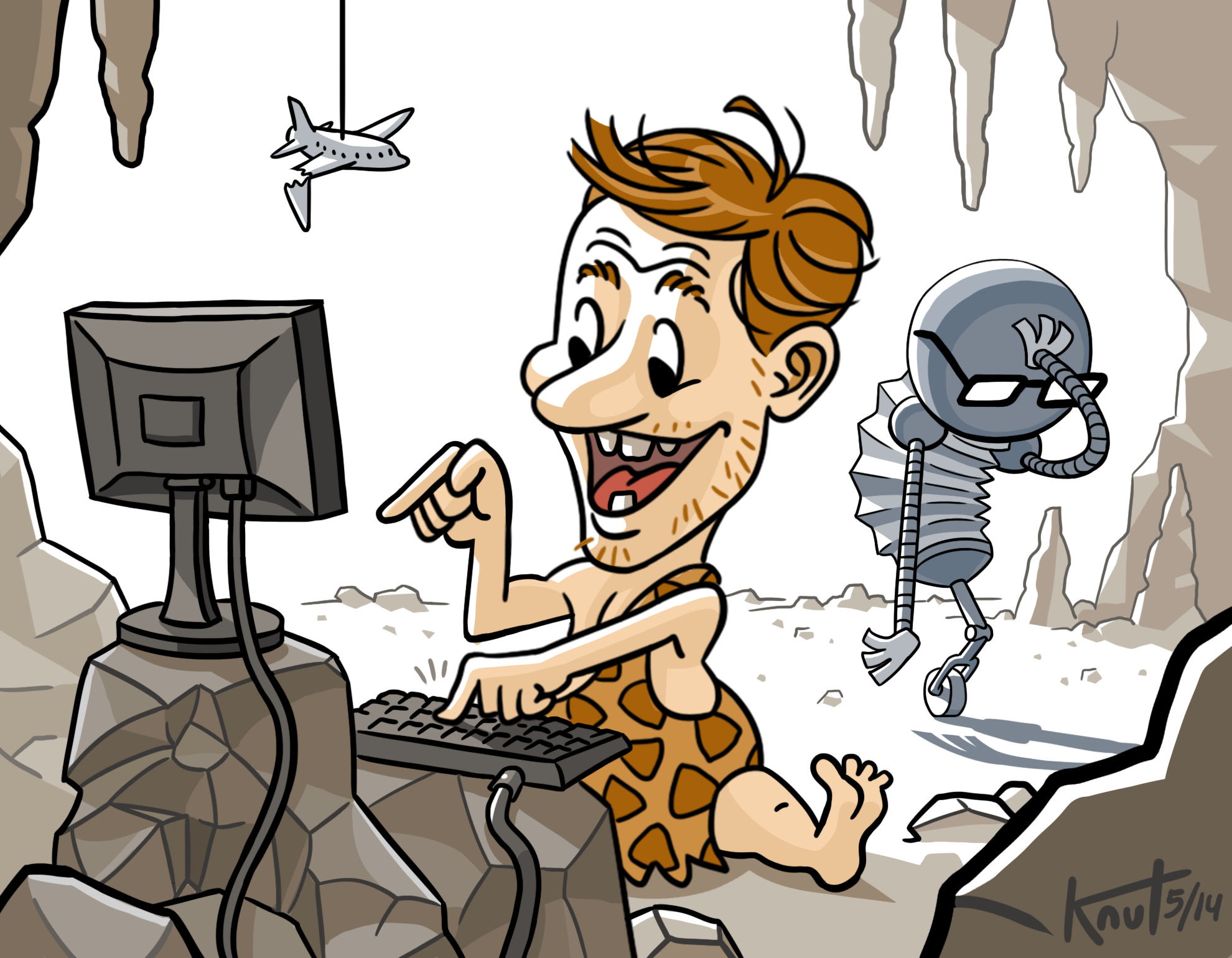
As this fan art depicts, Haran and Grey often refer to themselves respectively as a caveman and a robot to describe their differing personalities.

The podcast features discussions pertaining to their lives as professional creators for YouTube, the content of their most recent videos as well as their interests and annoyances. Typical topics include YouTube, technology etiquette, books, movie and TV show reviews, plane accidents, vexillology, futurology, and the differences between Haran and Grey's personalities and lifestyles.

== History ==
The "Nail & Gear", the podcast's official flag chosen by its listeners in a 2015 mail-in election

The podcast debuted in January 2014. That year it reached the #1 iTunes podcast in the United Kingdom. It was also selected as one of Apple's best emerging new podcasts of 2014.

In 2015, Brady Haran was credited with re-introducing the word "freebooting" during a podcast episode (episode 5, "Freebooting", released in 2014) to describe copyright infringement via re-hosting videos on platforms such as Facebook, a practice typically undertaken to profit from advertisements alongside the content. Facebook has since adopted tools to address this.

The Guardian included the podcast among its 50 best of 2016, naming episode 66 ("A Classic Episode") its episode of the year; the paper described the podcast as having "in-depth debates and banter that is actually amusing".

Beginning with episode 123 ("Pop Quiz"), after-show episodes titled Goodbye Internet were released as companion podcasts with the main episodes, exclusive for Patreon supporters of the "Goodbye Internet" tier.

The podcast has been inactive since 28 February 2020, when episode 136 was released. On 18 May 2020, Haran said on Reddit that they were taking a break.

== Episodes ==
As of January 2023, the most recent episode of Hello Internet is numbered 136. However, there are only 133 normal numbered episodes of Hello Internet as the numbering sometimes, although inconsistently, skips a number to accommodate the inclusion of one or more special unnumbered episodes, of which there are 18. These specials include one bonus episode, three Christmas specials discussing Star Wars movies, twelve episodes released during the end of 2018 as the "12 Days of Christmas," and two episodes that were not released digitally. The two non-digitally released episodes are available exclusively on physical media, the first on a vinyl record and the second on a wax cylinder.

The first 10 episodes (1–10) of Hello Internet were referred to as season 1, and the second 10 episodes (11–20) were referred to as season 2. Episode 21 was referred to as the first episode of season 3, and at the beginning of Episode 29, Episode 30 was referred to as the season finale of season 3 and Episode 31 was referred to as being in the 4th season, but the topic of seasons relating to the podcast was not discussed again until one hour into Episode 115, "Pink Flamingo."

No.	Title	Run Time	Original release date
1	"Being Wrong on The Internet"	38:45	31 January 2014
2	"Copyright Not Intended"	56:12	7 February 2014
3	"Four Light Bulbs"	50:40	11 February 2014
4	"Feedback on Feedback"	1:34:56	18 February 2014
5	"Freebooting"	1:22:33	26 February 2014
6	"Delete, Flag, Delete, Reply"	1:30:37	10 March 2014
7	"Sorry, Language Teachers"	1:36:14	17 March 2014
8	"First World YouTuber Problems"	1:26:14	31 March 2014
9	"Kids in a Box"	1:29:36	15 April 2014
10	"Two Dudes Talking"	1:34:21	23 April 2014
11	"Stream of Irrelevancy"	1:56:56	30 April 2014
12	"Hamburgers in the Pipes"	1:38:46	13 May 2014
13	"Nobody Owns the Facts"	1:39:02	28 May 2014
14	"How Humans Work"	1:57:40	10 June 2014
15	"Books Made of Paper"	1:53:54	24 June 2014
16	"The Worst Topic for a Podcast"	1:58:39	15 July 2014
17	"Mister Phoenix"	1:35:37	22 July 2014
18	"Monkey Copyright"	1:56:26	12 August 2014
19	"Pit of Doom"	1:43:03	24 August 2014
20	"Reverse Finger Trap"	2:32:25	8 September 2014
21	"Cave Troll in Your Pocket"	2:09:56	20 September 2014
22	"16-hour Search for Wallpaper"	1:41:32	10 October 2014
23	"Call of the Postbox"	1:44:43	28 October 2014
24	"Mr Complainy Pants"	2:10:31	2 November 2014
25	"Fantasy Stage"	1:31:19	24 November 2014
26	"Brady Had Dinner With Darth Vader"	1:52:29	12 December 2014
27	"Bumper Christmas Special"	2:49:36	25 December 2014
28	"Randomness in a Box"	1:28:39	5 January 2015
29	"Courses for Horses"	2:15:28	19 January 2015
30	"Fibonacci Dog Years"	1:57:46	2 February 2015
31	"An Enigma Wrapped in an Egg McMuffin"	1:38:09	16 February 2015
32	"YouTube Half-Assery"	1:56:01	2 March 2015
33	"Mission to Mars"	1:57:52	16 March 2015
34	"Line in the Sand"	1:42:58	30 March 2015
35	"Are My Teeth Real"	2:38:32	13 April 2015
36	"Bear O'Clock"	1:54:32	28 April 2015
37	"Penguins and Politics"	2:17:59	14 May 2015
38	"The F-Word"	2:00:23	25 May 2015
39	"Getting Things Done"	2:05:35	9 June 2015
40	"The Oval Office of Science"	1:33:36	16 June 2015
41	"Some Kind of Freak"	2:22:13	24 June 2015
42	"Never and Always"	2:37:27	7 July 2015
43	"The Naughty Episode"	1:53:28	17 July 2015
44	"Cursed Tickets"	1:55:12	11 August 2015
45	"Technobabble"	2:03:23	22 August 2015
46	"Superbowl of Flags"	1:48:01	31 August 2015
47	"Charismatic Megafauna"	2:06:50	22 September 2015
48	"Grumpy About Art"	2:09:47	29 September 2015
49	"Rabble-Rousing"	2:31:11	19 October 2015
—	"The Shortlist (BONUS EPISODE)"	50:33	21 October 2015
50	"Queen of Spades"	2:38:02	6 November 2015
51	"Appropriately Thinking it"	1:56:20	16 November 2015
52	"20,000 Years of Torment"	2:05:14	30 November 2015
53	"Two Dudes Counting"	1:57:39	16 December 2015
54	"Star Wars Christmas Special"	2:40:45	25 December 2015
55	"Element Zod"	1:38:29	13 January 2016
56	"Guns, Germs, and Steel"	2:01:36	29 January 2016
57	"Podcasters React"	2:06:09	17 February 2016
58	"Hawk & Mouse"	1:42:44	29 February 2016
59	"Consumed by Donkey Kong"	2:07:10	26 March 2016
60	"The Beautiful Game"	1:36:48	30 March 2016
61	"Tesla and King Tut"	1:50:32	20 April 2016
62	"Cheer Pressure"	1:39:50	29 April 2016
63	"One in Five Thousand"	2:04:05	18 May 2016
64	"The Quiz Show"	1:42:09	26 May 2016
65	"Operation Zeus"	1:23:29	30 June 2016
66	"A Classic Episode"	1:56:52	18 July 2016
67	"Doctor Brady"	1:41:10	31 July 2016
68	"Project Revolution"	1:46:14	30 August 2016
69	"Ex_Machina"	2:34:49	16 September 2016
70	"Bun Fight"	1:34:27	30 September 2016
71	"Trolley Problem"	1:42:01	27 October 2016
72	"64 Pairs of Underwear"	1:23:15	31 October 2016
73	"Unofficial Official"	1:41:23	21 November 2016
—	"The Vinyl Episode"	45:20	29 November 2016
74	"Black Mirror Season 3"	1:49:59	30 November 2016
75	"'World's Most Interesting Podcast'"	1:48:10	26 December 2016
—	"Rogue One Star Wars Christmas Special"	1:48:09	26 December 2016
77	"Woah, Dude"	1:54:55	31 January 2017
78	"LXXVIII"	1:31:02	16 February 2017
79	"From Russia with Love"	1:38:10	16 March 2017
80	"Operation Twinkle Toes"	1:45:11	28 March 2017
81	"Adpocalypse"	2:32:13	27 April 2017
82	"God of Bees"	2:00:19	13 May 2017
83	"The Best Kind of Prison"	1:46:31	26 May 2017
84	"Sloppy Buns"	1:38:10	29 June 2017
85	"Another Person I've Never Heard Of"	1:56:54	25 July 2017
86	"Banana Republic"	1:31:48	24 August 2017
87	"Podcast of the Century"	1:50:37	31 August 2017
88	"Do Not Ring Bell"	1:18:17	19 September 2017
89	"A Swarm of Bad Emoji"	1:57:58	28 September 2017
90	"Pumpkin Pressure"	1:56:20	19 October 2017
91	"Last Man to Die?"	2:00:22	31 October 2017
92	"Grey Honeypot"	1:53:57	24 November 2017
93	"Mr. Chompers"	1:51:32	30 November 2017
94	"Video of Meaninglessness"	1:54:03	22 December 2017
—	"Star Wars The Last Jedi Christmas Special"	1:55:00	25 December 2017
95	"Break Glass in Case of Emergency"	1:54:55	31 December 2017
96	"The Humblebug"	2:21:57	31 January 2018
97	"Tesla in Space"	1:32:10	19 February 2018
98	"The Dogfather"	1:16:51	27 February 2018
99	"The Necessary Lies of Civilization"	1:37:59	21 March 2018
100	"Hello Internet Episode One Hundred"	1:24:12	29 March 2018
101	"😐🔫"	1:53:06	25 April 2018
102	"Secret Cinema"	1:57:46	23 May 2018
103	"Don't Read The Comments"	1:43:25	30 May 2018
104	"Fruitbooting"	2:02:56	28 June 2018
105	"A Recent Hello Internet"	1:26:23	19 July 2018
106	"Water on Mars"	1:38:44	30 July 2018
107	"One Year of Weird"	1:37:50	23 August 2018
108	"Project Cyclops"	1:57:10	28 August 2018
109	"Twitter War Room"	2:00:09	10 September 2018
110	"Love Monkey"	1:27:40	17 September 2018
111	"Disgusting Wheel of Filth"	1:32:39	14 October 2018
112	"Consistency Hobgoblins"	1:46:33	30 October 2018
113	"Thelma & Louise"	1:17:54	27 November 2018
114	"Stunt Peanut"	1:35:58	28 November 2018
115	"Pink Flamingo"	1:51:23	23 December 2018
—	"A Partridge in a Pear Tree"	19:34	25 December 2018
—	"Two Turtle Doves"	20:06	26 December 2018
—	"Three French Hens"	14:06	27 December 2018
—	"Four Calling Birds"	16:32	28 December 2018
—	"Five Gold Rings"	13:12	29 December 2018
—	"Six Geese A-laying"	14:02	30 December 2018
—	"Seven Swans A-Swimming"	22:10	31 December 2018
—	"Eight Maids A-Milking"	28:12	1 January 2019
—	"Nine Ladies Dancing"	18:14	2 January 2019
—	"Ten Lords A-leaping"	15:19	3 January 2019
—	"Eleven Pipers Piping"	21:17	4 January 2019
—	"Twelve Drummers Drumming"	31:13	5 January 2019
117	"Bandersnatch"	1:27:14	30 January 2019
118	"Dinosaurs Attack!"	1:23:00	26 February 2019
119	"Hit The Holler Horn"	1:31:08	28 February 2019
120	"Battle Tested"	1:47:37	14 March 2019
121	"Mr Speaker"	1:12:57	31 March 2019
122	"Wax Cylinders"	1:23:57	24 April 2019
123	"Pop Quiz"	1:24:24	30 April 2019
124	"Double High Five"	1:24:39	27 May 2019
—	"The Wax Cylinder Episode"	~2:00	10 June 2019
125	"The Spice Must Flow"	1:22:31	30 June 2019
126	"Team Woo Woo"	1:39:20	27 July 2019
127	"Very Hello Internet"	1:22:31	31 July 2019
128	"Complaint Tablet Podcast"	1:16:40	31 August 2019
129	"Sunday Spreadsheets"	1:45:45	3 October 2019
130	"Remember Harder"	1:33:41	29 October 2019
131	"Panda Park"	1:36:29	20 November 2019
132	"Artisan Water"	1:32:00	23 December 2019
—	"Star Wars: The Rise of Skywalker, Hello Internet Christmas Special"	1:55:50	25 December 2019
134	"Boxing Day"	1:22:48	30 December 2019
135	"Place Your Bets"	1:29:57	23 January 2020
136	"Dog Bingo"	1:21:55	28 February 2020

== See also ==
- Cortex
- The Unmade Podcast
- The Numberphile Podcast
