= CGP Grey =

American educational YouTuber

- The stick figure CGP Grey uses to represent himself in his videos and elsewhere
- Born: Richmond County, New York, U.S.
- Other name: Grey

YouTube information
- Channels: CGP Grey; CGP Grey 2
- Years active: 2010–present
- Genre: Education
- Subscribers: 7.04 million
- Views: 1.29 billion
- Last updated: 5 October 2026
- Website: www.cgpgrey.com

CGP Grey is an American educational YouTuber, podcaster, and live streamer based in the United Kingdom who creates explanatory videos on subjects including politics, geography, economics, sociology, history, philosophy, and culture. He created and hosts the podcasts Hello Internet (2014–2020) with Brady Haran and Cortex (2015–) with Myke Hurley.

== Early life and career ==
Grey went to college in upstate New York, earning two degrees: one in physics and another in sociology. When Grey was a child, his father applied for Irish citizenship on his behalf, and he gained dual American–Irish citizenship.

Grey's Irish citizenship allowed him to move to the United Kingdom. He attended a masters program in economics and became a physics teacher while in London.

== Content ==
Grey's primary YouTube channel, CGP Grey, predominantly features explanatory videos on subjects including politics, geography, economics, history, productivity, the Internet, transportation, vexillology, science, American culture, and British culture. The videos intend to debunk common misconceptions or answer everyday questions people may hold.

The videos feature Grey narrating over animations, stock footage, and still photographs. While nearly all of his videos feature his voice, his face has never been shown in his videos, and he almost always has his face obscured when appearing in other people's videos; he generally uses a stick figure with glasses to represent himself. He has stated that the presentation style of his videos is influenced by that of Ben "Yahtzee" Croshaw's Zero Punctuation series.

Grey's video that debunks popular misconceptions has been featured on CBS, as has his video about the history of the British royal family. Two videos differentiate London and the City of London, while explaining the history and government of the latter. Another two videos explaining copyright law and the Electoral College have been featured on Mashable. The channel also explains the economic disadvantages of US one-cent coins in a video titled Death to Pennies. Other videos, including How to Become Pope, have received media attention and have been used in instructional settings. His video on the American debt limit received praise from economists.

Grey's video Humans Need Not Apply was covered by Business Insider and Huffington Post, and his animated video of Nick Bostrom's "The Fable of the Dragon-Tyrant" was "unanimously praised" by the Life Extension Advocacy Foundation. In collaboration with fellow YouTuber Kurzgesagt, he produced a video titled "You Are Two" which discusses the right brain versus the left brain. Popular Mechanics featured videos by Grey about airplane boarding and traffic congestion.

== Podcasts ==
Logo of Hello Internet

In January 2014, Grey launched the podcast Hello Internet along with co-host Brady Haran, another educational YouTuber and online content creator. The podcast peaked as the No. 1 iTunes podcast in United Kingdom, United States, Germany, Canada, and Australia in February 2014. The Guardian included the podcast among its 50 best of 2016, naming episode 66 ("A Classic Episode") its episode of the year. The paper described the podcast as having: "in-depth debates and banter that is actually amusing." Grey reported a podcast listenership of approximately "a quarter million" downloads per episode as of September 2015.

The podcast features discussions pertaining to their lives as professional content creators for YouTube, as well as their interests and annoyances. Typical topics include technology etiquette; movie and TV show reviews; plane accidents; vexillology; futurology; and the differences between Grey's and Haran's personalities and lifestyles. Their opinions and comments on feedback usually starts the next episode of the podcast. As a result of their conversations, Haran has been noted for reappropriating the term "freebooting", among other words, to refer to the unauthorized re-hosting of online media. The podcast has been on hiatus since May 2020.

On 3 June 2015, Grey launched his second podcast, Cortex, with co-host Myke Hurley of Relay FM. Following ten years of Cortex, CGP Grey announced a break from Cortex, with the podcast temporarily switching to an interview format.

== Reception ==
In 2013, Caitlin Dewey wrote that Grey is regarded as a "celebrity in the niche world of educational YouTube videos." According to economist Joshua Gans, "while they may not be names in the halls of academia," YouTubers like Grey "have brought diverse explanations of mathematics, physics, political institutions, and history to millions on the Internet."

Robert Krulwich of NPR wrote that Grey has "a curious talent for truth telling; he can take a charming lie and, with even more charm, rip it apart. It is very, very hard, as any teacher will tell you, to unlearn something that makes you comfortable and makes you feel smart, but Mr. Grey has the knack."
