= Mohammad Sami (disambiguation) =

Mohammad Sami (born 1981) is a Pakistani cricket fast bowler.

Mohammad Sami may also refer to:

- Mohammad Sami (cricketer, born 1984), Pakistani first-class cricketer
- Mohammad Sami Agha (born 1989), Afghan cricketer
- Mohammed Shami (born 1990), Indian cricketer
- Mohammad Sami (professor) (born 1955), Indian theoretical physicist and cosmologist
- Mohammad Samir Hossain (born 1976), Bangladeshi theorist
- Mohamed Sami, Egyptian writer
