= Jason Snell (writer) =

American writer, editor, and podcaster (born 1970)

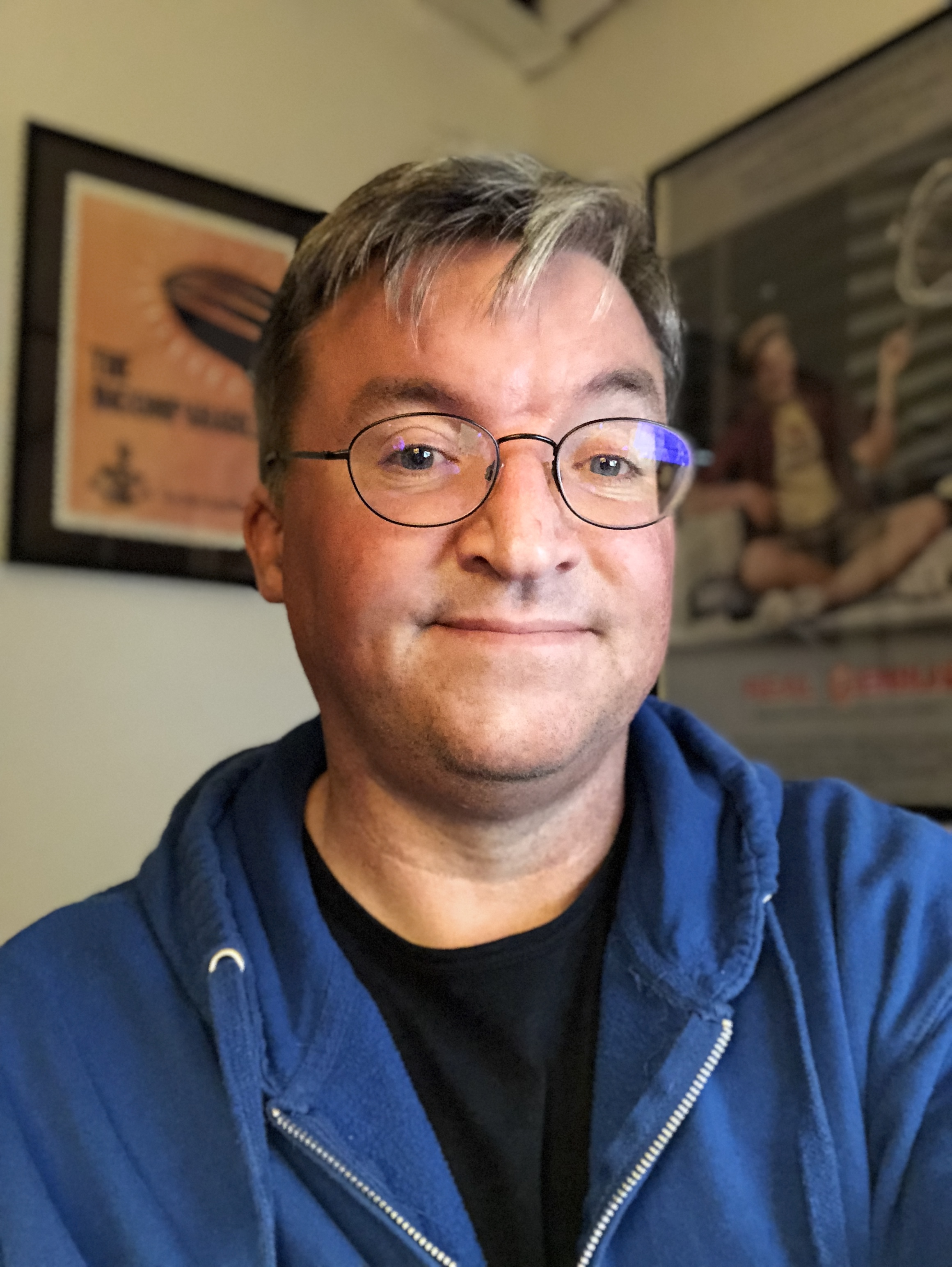
- Snell in 2017
- Born: October 6, 1970 (age 56); Oakland, California, U.S.

Jason Snell (born October 6, 1970) is an American writer, editor, and podcaster who covers technology—heavily focused on Apple Inc.'s Macintosh computers, iPhones, and services—and pop culture. Snell was an early Internet publisher, producing the fiction journal InterText, as well as creating or editing several other early Internet magazines and websites. He served in a variety of editorial positions at IDG during more than 25 years, including as editor-in-chief of Macworld magazine, ultimately becoming senior vice president of IDG Consumer & Small Business Publishing (CSMB).

In 2014 Snell left Macworld and founded Six Colors, a website that covers technology and Apple products. He owns and operates the podcast network, The Incomparable, focused on panel discussions of pop-culture, as well as a dedicated game-show podcast.

== Biography ==
Snell grew up in Sonora, California, graduating from Sonora Union High School in 1988. He attended Revelle College at the University of California, San Diego, working for three years on the staff of the UCSD Guardian newspaper.

In 1991, while at UCSD, Snell founded InterText, an early Internet-based magazine, which was originally distributed via FTP and e-mail in plain-text and PostScript formats. InterText published hundreds of short stories in various genres until it ceased publication in 2004. Snell later served on the board of the National Novel Writing Month, from 2011–2017.

Snell graduated in 1992 with a degree in Communication. In 1994 he received a master's degree from the Graduate School of Journalism at the University of California, Berkeley.

=== Technology journalism ===
In 1994 Snell began working at the U.S. edition of MacUser magazine, beginning his career writing about the Macintosh computer. When MacUser was bought and absorbed into Macworld in 1997, Snell moved with the magazine. Within a few years, he became the lead editor of Macworld, and eventually became senior vice president at the magazine's publisher IDG. During this period, in 2006, the MDJ Power 25, a poll of Mac-industry-watchers, named him the 6th most powerful/influential person in the world of Macintosh computing. After multiple rounds of layoffs during a downturn in tech publishing, Snell departed the company in 2014. He continued to write a weekly column for Macworld until 2026.

In 1996, he co-founded Internet humor and commentary site TeeVee.org, which lives on through a podcast of the same name.

Following Snell's 2014 departure from Macworld and IDG, he created and launched Six Colors, a members-supported editorial website where he and his former Macworld colleague Dan Moren write about technology, Apple products, and podcasting.

=== Podcasting ===
In 2010 Snell began host and producing The Incomparable podcast, a weekly panel show discussing science-fiction, fantasy, and more general geek-culture television shows, movies, comic books, and books. The show soon expanded into an eponymous network which hosts more than twenty shows from a variety of contributors. The Incomparable won the Parsec Award for Best Speculative Fiction Fan or News Podcast in 2012, 2015, and 2016.

Snell co-hosts, with Myke Hurley, the Relay podcasts Upgrade (since 2014), and Designed in California (since 2026). He previously co-hosted the Relay podcasts Liftoff and Downstream.

=== Personal life ===
He lives in Mill Valley, California, with his wife. He has two children. Snell competed on the March 19th, 2026 episode of Jeopardy!, losing to eventual 31 day champion Jamie Ding.
