= Matt Parker =

Australian comedian and mathematician (born 1980)

- Parker in 2026
- Born: Matthew Thomas Parker; 22 December 1980 (age 45); Perth, Western Australia
- Education: University of Western Australia
- Occupations: Mathematics author and communicator
- Known for: Vlogging; stand-up comedy
- Notable work: Love Triangle: The Life-Changing Magic of Trigonometry
- Spouse: Lucie Green (m. 2014)
- Awards: Christopher Zeeman Medal (2020)

YouTube information
- Channel: Stand-up Maths
- Years active: 2009-present
- Genres: Education; comedy
- Subscribers: 1.35 million
- Views: 187 million
- Last updated: 21 August 2026
- Website: standupmaths.com

Matthew Thomas Parker (born 22 December 1980) is an Australian recreational mathematician, author, comedian, YouTube personality and science communicator based in the United Kingdom. He is a New York Times best-selling author and his book Humble Pi was the first mathematics book in the UK to be a Sunday Times No. 1 bestseller. He is a former teacher and has helped popularise mathematics via his tours and videos.

== Early life and education ==
Matt Parker was born in Perth, Western Australia, and grew up in the northern suburb of Duncraig. He began showing an interest in maths and science from a young age, and at one point was part of his school's titration team.

Parker went to the University of Western Australia and started off studying mechanical engineering before he "realized the very real risk of being employable at the end of it." He switched into physics and later mathematics. His love of maths led him to want a job in the subject.

While at university, Parker wrote comedy for Pelican, the students' magazine, and produced comedy sketches. Having become interested in comedy, he enrolled on a course for stand-up.

== Career ==
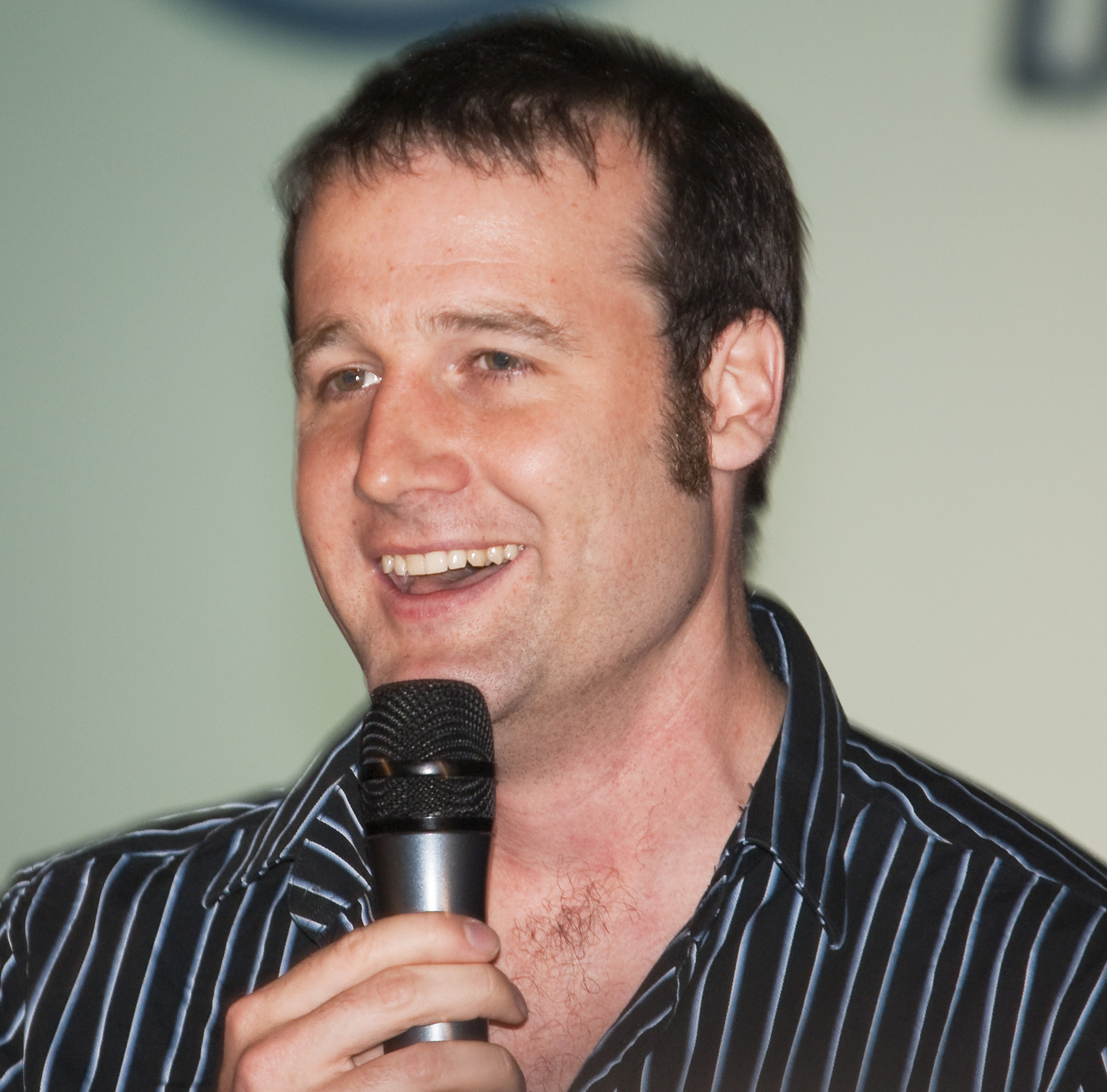
Parker speaking at QED in 2011

After college, Parker taught maths in Australia for a while before moving to London and continuing teaching. He became involved in support education, working with universities and other organizations to arrange maths talks. He later returned to teaching, before stopping after one year. He now helps students communicate mathematics to other people, speaks at schools, does media work, and occasionally writes about maths. His goal is "to get more people more excited about maths." Parker was the Public Engagement in Mathematics Fellow at Queen Mary University of London.

Parker has appeared in numerous YouTube videos, talking about various subjects related to mathematics. He has his own YouTube channel, "Stand-up Maths", with over one million subscribers, and also frequently appears as a guest on other popular channels such as Brady Haran's Numberphile and James May's Head Squeeze (now BritLab). Parker has made videos about unboxing calculators, including the Little Professor; he presents these videos as a member of a fictional "Calculator Appreciation Society". He also appeared in a Tom Scott YouTube video, where they gave advice for users of the London Underground.

In 2012, Parker and fellow comedian Timandra Harkness co-wrote a comedy show called Your Days are Numbered: The Maths of Death. They performed the show in Australia, at the Adelaide Fringe and Melbourne International Comedy Festival, on tour around England and in Scotland, at the Edinburgh Festival Fringe. Parker has also toured the UK solo and as part of comedy group Festival of the Spoken Nerd, along with Helen Arney and Steve Mould. His first solo tour, Matt Parker: Number Ninja, finished in July 2013, while his second solo tour, "Matt Parker: Now in 4D", started in late 2014.

Parker published his first book, Things to Make and Do in the Fourth Dimension, in 2014. He also created a supplementary website to the book. His second book, Humble Pi, was released in March 2019 and was a Sunday Times No. 1 bestseller. In 2024, his third book, Love Triangle, was published.

In 2014, Parker set up Think Maths, a team of experienced mathematics speakers who visit schools to run workshops and give talks for a wide range of ages and abilities, to show students the wider world of maths beyond school while giving them a chance to develop mathematical thinking skills. In 2016, Parker appeared briefly as a guest on the British comedy panel game quiz show QI.

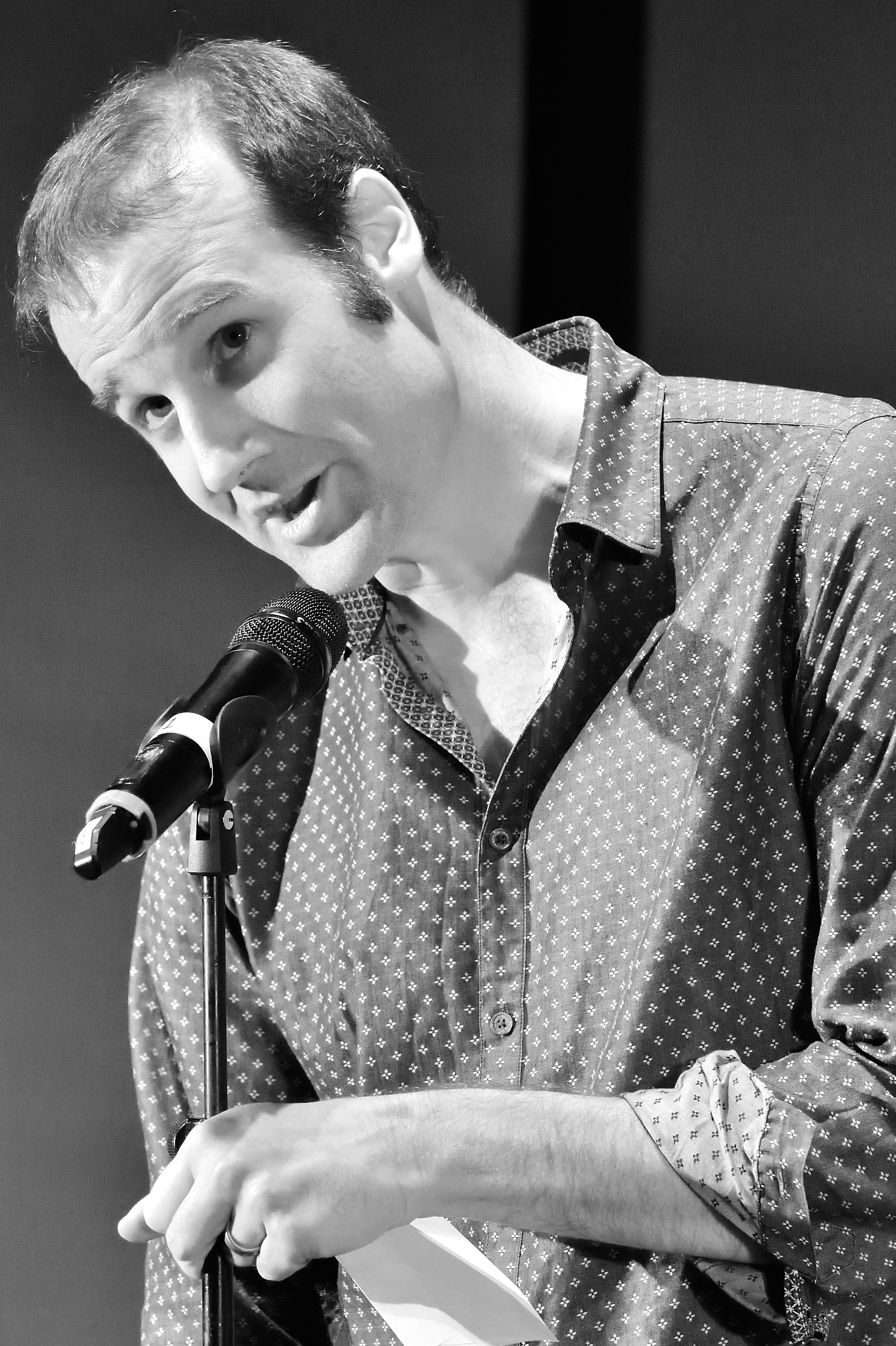
Parker speaking at QED in 2016

Parker has appeared on BBC Radio Four's The Infinite Monkey Cage with Robin Ince and Brian Cox. He has also talked about maths-related topics on BBC News, Sky News, Channel4, CBBC, and occasionally writes for The Guardian. On TV, Parker is a regular commentator on Discovery's Outrageous Acts of Science. For the 2019 edition of the Royal Institution Christmas Lectures, televised on BBC Four, Parker assisted presenter Hannah Fry in several segments.

In October 2017, Parker started a petition to "Update the UK Traffic Signs Regulations to a geometrically correct football." In a YouTube video, he explained why the current football shape on traffic signs is incorrect and geometrically impossible. Parker described the current signs as a "national embarrassment" and said he hopes the petition will "help raise public awareness and appreciation of geometry." Parker discussed the issue at You Can't Polish A Nerd. According to him, the government initially dismissed the petition because he is a comedian. By November 2017, the petition had gained over 22,000 signatures. The UK government has responded by saying "the current football symbol has a clear meaning and is understood by the public. Changing the design to show accurate geometry is not appropriate in this context." Parker said he felt "like the Department for Transport had not read the petition properly". The official response stated it would be too costly to replace the current signs; however, Parker said he only asked for a "precedent for the new signs". In regards to the exact geometry of a football, Parker said he is "not asking for angles and measurements on the sign, just for it to look more like a football". In 2024, he created a new petition to change the real footballs to look like the signs when viewed from one angle, because "if we can't get the signs changed to match a real football, maybe we can get the football changed to match the signs".

Together with another YouTube mathematics populariser, Vi Hart, Parker won the 2018 Communications Award of the Joint Policy Board for Mathematics for "communicating the excitement of mathematics to a worldwide audience through YouTube videos, TV and radio appearances, book and newspaper writings, and stand-up comedy".

Parker hosts two podcasts. The newer of the two, A Podcast of Unnecessary Detail, is co-hosted with Helen Arney and Steve Mould; the three also perform as the comedy troupe Festival of the Spoken Nerd, and have a stage show titled An Evening of Unnecessary Detail, from which the podcast derives its name. In the podcast, each of the hosts brings a topic, usually maths or science related, which they explain to the audience. The first series of six episodes aired during September 2020 as a way for the troupe to continue to perform their show during the COVID-19 pandemic. A second series of twelve episodes aired during 2022. The older podcast is A Problem Squared, which is formatted as an advice-based podcast, and is co-hosted with author, comedian, and TV presenter Bec Hill. In A Problem Squared, each cohost presents a problem submitted by listeners, which they attempt to exhaustively solve via their own research, sometimes bringing in special guests. New episodes aired monthly from November 2019, to January 2022, and then semimonthly starting in March 2022.

Parker acted as a counting agent (observer) for Count Binface's candidacy at the 2024 UK general election, as well as creating graphics for Binface's election pamphlet.

=== Awards ===
Parker was awarded the 2020 IMA-LMS Christopher Zeeman Medal in recognition of his "excellence in the communication of mathematics". The award citation highlights work on YouTube, his books, Think Maths, Maths Inspiration, MathsJam, Maths Gear, and his work in broadcast media.

On 15 August 2024, the main-belt asteroid 314159 Mattparker (3.14159 being the starting digits of pi) was named in his honour. The citation highlights Parker's biennial "Pi Day challenges", stating that they have helped to popularise mathematics.

== Recreational mathematics contributions ==
Parker introduced the recreational mathematics concept of a grafting number, an integer with the property that the square root of the integer, when expressed in base $b$, will contain the original integer itself before or directly after the decimal point (sequence A232087 in the OEIS).

Each odd-numbered year on 14 March, Parker organises what has been described as "Pi day challenges", where he attempts to calculate the number pi ($\pi$) by hand. In 2024, Parker and a team of hundreds of volunteers at City of London School spent six days calculating 139 correct digits of pi by hand, in what he claimed was "the biggest hand calculation in a century".

Parker is the namesake of the Parker square, an internet meme consisting of a trivial semimagic square. Parker was attempting to create a magic square of squares, however fell quite short of the goal. The semimagic square Parker created uses some numbers more than once, and the diagonal 23^{2} + 37^{2} + 47^{2} sums to 4107, not 3051 as for all the other rows, columns, or diagonal. The Parker Square became a "mascot for people who give it a go, but ultimately fall short". It is also a metaphor for something that is almost right, but is a little off.

== Personal life ==
Parker married the English solar physicist Lucie Green in July 2014. The couple used wedding rings made of meteoric iron. He now lives in Godalming, England. He has a Labrador Retriever called Skylab who has her own YouTube channel. He has a brother, Steve, who works as a software developer.

== Bibliography ==
- Parker, Matt (2015). Things to Make and Do in the Fourth Dimension: A Mathematician's Journey Through Narcissistic Numbers, Optimal Dating Algorithms, at Least Two Kinds of Infinity, and More. Farrar, Straus and Giroux. ISBN 978-0-374-53563-6.
- Parker, Matt (2019). Humble Pi: A comedy of maths errors. Allen Lane. ISBN 9780241360231.
- Parker, Matt (2024). Love Triangle: The Life-changing Magic of Trigonometry. Penguin Books. ISBN 9780241505694.
