= May-Li Khoe =

Dutch-Canadian engineer and designer

- Born: 1977 (age 48–49); Netherlands
- Education: Massachusetts Institute of Technology (BS, M.Eng), San Francisco State University
- Spouse: Federico Ardila
- Scientific career
- Fields: Human-computer interaction, educational technology, user experience design
- Workplaces: Vice President of Design at Khan Academy, Former designer at Apple Inc.
- Website: www.maylikhoe.com

May-Li Khoe (born 1977) is a Dutch-Canadian engineer and designer known for her work in user experience design, software development, and human-computer interaction, as well as mentoring activities in the tech industry. She has worked for companies and organisations including Apple, Microsoft and Khan Academy, and has been involved in entrepreneurial projects such as Scribble Together and Boogie Loops.

== Education ==
In 1999, Khoe completed her undergraduate degree in Electrical Engineering and Computer Science at the Massachusetts Institute of Technology (MIT). She then pursued a Master of Engineering (MEng) degree, completed in 2000. During her time at MIT, she researched human-computer interaction and user interface design under the supervision of Pattie Maes at the MIT Media Lab. Khoe is also pursuing a Master of Fine Arts (MFA) in Creative Writing at San Francisco State University.

== Career ==
Khoe began her career working with HyperTalk programming in HyperCard, where she created interactive educational tools and games. These early projects marked the beginning of her focus on integrating design and technology to improve user experience.

=== Microsoft ===
Khoe worked at Microsoft from June 2004 to November 2006. She collaborated with the Microsoft User Experience (MSX) team, providing design support for various product teams. Her work focused on entertainment software, including music, radio, video, and movies, as well as information retrieval tools such as search and information agents. Khoe is also believed to have contributed to the design of SongSmith, a music creation application, based on early design mockups from the project.

=== Apple Inc. ===
At Apple, Khoe worked as an Interaction Designer and Prototyper in Apple's Human Interface Device Prototyping group. She contributed to the development of screen animation technologies and the design of features such Force Touch and Taptic Engine, which were integrated into devices like the first iPhone, the first iPad Mini, Apple Watch, MacBook Pro, iPhone 6s. Additionally, Khoe helped design user interactions for the iPad Pro, iPad Mini, and Apple Pencil.

As a designer at Apple from 2006–2010, Khoe was responsible for the design and prototyping of applications for the iPhone, iPad, and web. Her work included concept development, visual design, and interaction design. She contributed to products such as Find My iPhone, initial concepts for Find My Friends, and the MobileMe and iCloud applications. She also contributed to the design of the Safari news reader for iPhone and the Mac Gallery in collaboration with other design and with Engineering Program Managers (EPMs) and designers. gaining experience in various stages of the design process, from material testing to ensuring technical specifications were met.

=== Khan Academy ===
Khoe served as Vice President of Design at Khan Academy, a nonprofit educational organization focused on providing accessible education. In this role, she contributed to the development of user search methodologies and design systems aimed at enhancing the platform's usability and functionality. She also implemented team evaluation processes to support collaboration and inclusivity within the design team.

=== Entrepreneurship and mentorship ===
Khoe has been involved in projects combining design, technology, and user-focused innovation. She co-created Boogie Loops, a music and dance creation application for the Playdate console, and co-founded Scribble Together, a collaborative whiteboard application designed to support educational technology and remote work solutions. Additionally, Khoe participated in the Dynamicland initiative, working on spatial computing, tangible interfaces, and accessibility across platforms. She has offered guidance to startups and individuals in the technology and design fields, focusing on both creative and technical growth.

==== Scribble Together and Boogie Loops ====
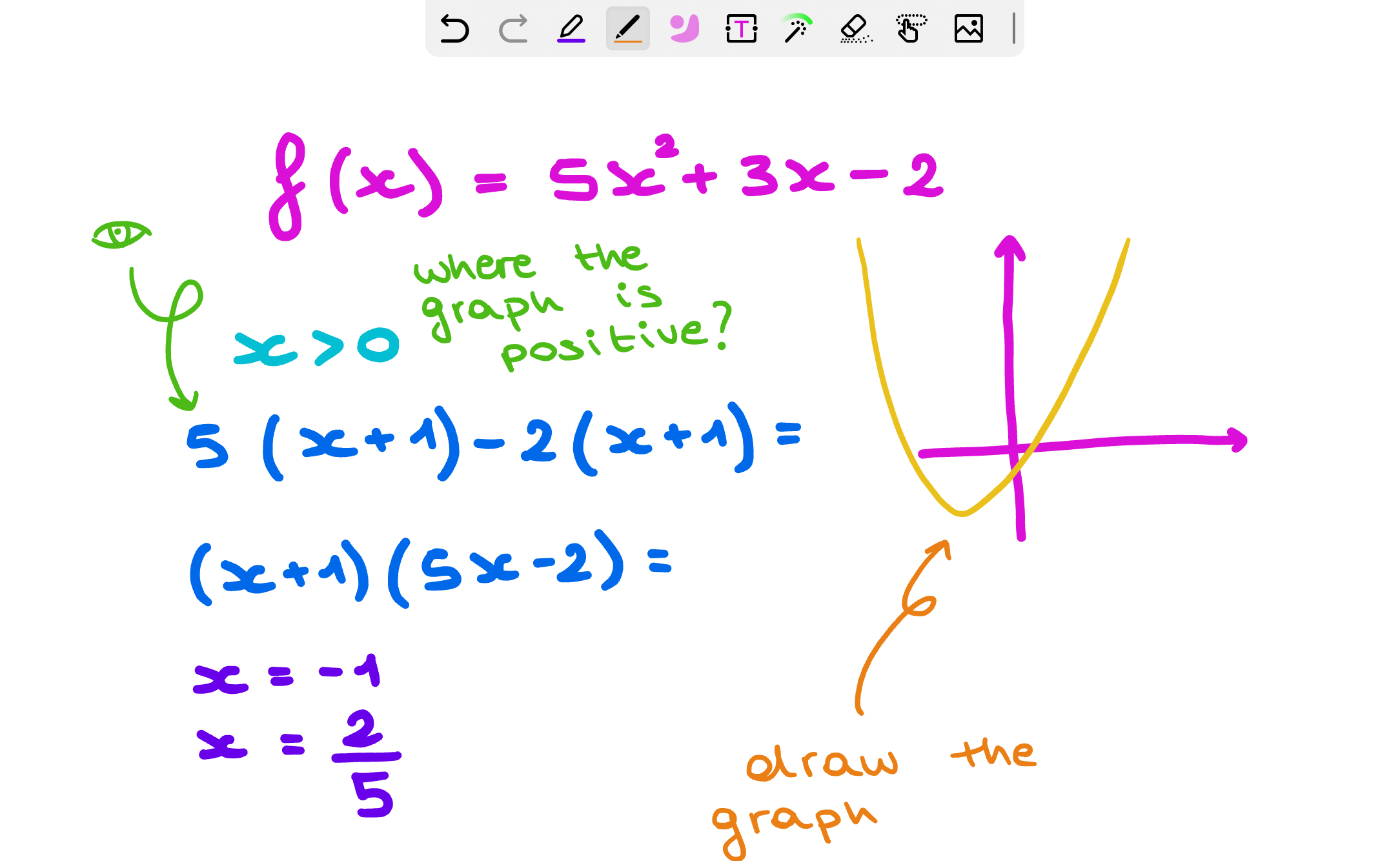
Example of a Scribble Together whiteboard, illustrating its use for collaborative functions and interactive sessions.

In 2018, Khoe and Bridger Maxwell launched Scribble Together, an online collaborative whiteboard designed for real-time brainstorming and drawing. Initially aimed at educational and creative uses, the platform later expanded to support remote work and team collaboration, particularly during the shift to virtual communication in the early 2020s. Its features, such as multi-user drawing and screen sharing, have been supported by educators, artists, and teams and have been adopted in both professional and educational fields.

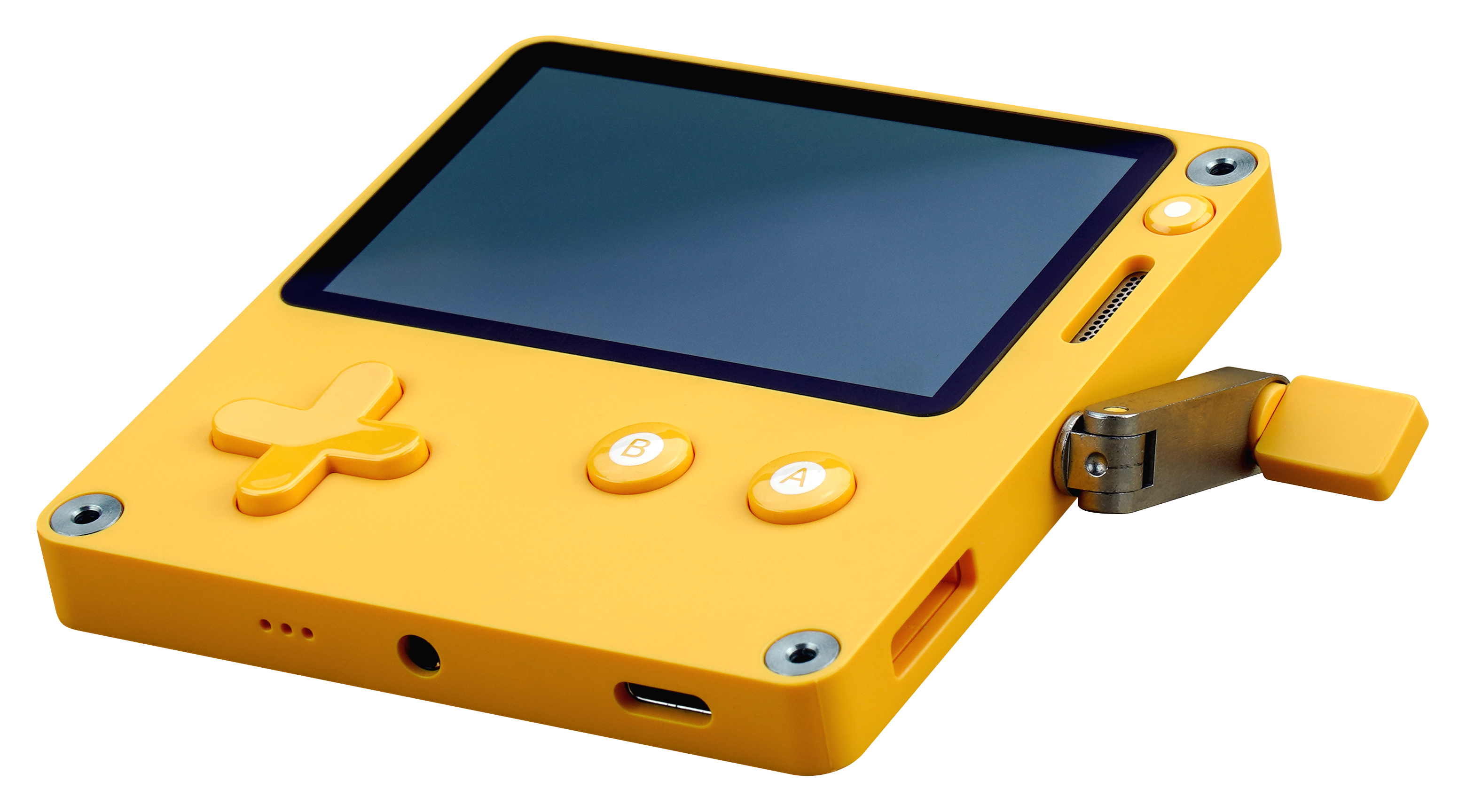
May Li-Khoe developed Boogie Loops to exploit the crank on the Playdate console

Boogie Loops, released on April 25, 2022, as part of the Playdate console's first season, is a game focused on creating layered musical loops and choreographing synchronised dance routines. It utilizes the Playdate console's crank mechanism to enhance interactivity, combining elements of music, art, and technology.

==== Sprout ====
Khoe is a co-founder and advisor with expertise in technology, collaboration, and user experience (UX) design. She was involved in the development of Sprout, a platform designed to support remote collaboration through tools such as video meetings, interactive whiteboards, and customizable spaces.

==== Dynamicland ====
Khoe contributed to Dynamicland, an experimental project in Oakland, focusing on developing new methods of interacting with digital information in physical spaces. Dynamicland used spatial computing to create immersive environments that replaced traditional screens with interactive surfaces, enabling users to interact with digital content through tangible objects and natural gestures, fostering collaborative and hand-on experiences.

The project aimed to shift from individual, screen-based interaction to communal, physical computing within room-sized environments. Khoe also worked on the Number Rectangle, a prototype created with Toby Schachman, Bret Victor, and Robert M. Ochshorn. The project examined how resizing the width of columns in a grid could reveal periodic patterns in numerical arrangements. The goal was to visualize periodicity within number grids, reflecting Khoe's broader interest in mathematical visualization and the interaction between visual and numerical structures.

=== Publications and recognition ===
In 2021, Khoe served as the Jury Chair for the Interaction Awards, hosted by the Interaction Design Association (IxDA), an event recognizing achievements in interaction design.

== Personal life ==
Khoe is married to Federico Ardila, a Colombian mathematician specializing in combinatorics and matroid theory. In 2019, Khoe joined Ardila on a sabbatical which involved traveling to cities such as Paris, Bologna, and Bogotá. During this period, she created a travel-themed newsletter, which led her to pursue a Master of Fine Arts (MFA) program in Creative Writing at San Francisco State University, focusing on non-fiction and genre narratives.

In 2008, Khoe and Ardila, along with friends, attended the Petronio Álvarez Music Festival in Colombia and co-founded the La Pelanga Collective, which promotes international tropical music and cultural exchange. Khoe and Ardila are members of two musical groups: Vallenato Gozaimasu and Neblinas del Pacífico, which explore intersections between Colombian and Japanese musical traditions. They have also collaborated with organizations like the People's Kitchen Collective and The Wall Project to support community initiatives in Puerto Buenaventura, Colombia's Pacific coast.
