= Love Triangle (book) =

2024 book about trigonometry

Love Triangle: The Life-Changing Magic of Trigonometry
- Cover of hardcover 1st edition
- Author: Matt Parker
- Language: English
- Subject: Trigonometry
- Genre: Non-fiction
- Publisher: Riverhead Books
- Publication date: August 20, 2024
- Publication place: United States
- Pages: 352
- ISBN: 978-0593418109

Love Triangle: The Life-Changing Magic of Trigonometry is a 2024 non-fiction book by Matt Parker. It examines how applications of trigonometry have been foundational throughout history, including in contemporary times.

The book was published by Riverhead Books.

== Synopsis ==
In Love Triangle, Matt Parker encourages readers to appreciate the geometry of triangles because it is the foundation of our modern world. It offers "practical applications of triangles" in an interesting and humorous narration.

The book is divided into ten chapters, titled:

1. Going the Distance
2. A New Angle
3. Laws and Orders
4. Meshing About
5. Well Fit
6. Where Do Shapes Come From?
7. Getting Triggy with It
8. Where on Earth?
9. But Is It Art?
10. Making Waves

Sine Function (One Period)

An interesting feature of the book is the page numbering system. The introduction begins on page 0.0000000, which is followed by page 0.017452. The decimal numbering continues increasing until 1.0000000 and then decreases to -1.0000000 before increasing back to 0.0000000. The page numbers represent the values of the sine function. Parker initially wanted to make the book exactly 360 pages long (equal to the number of degrees in a circle); however, the publisher would not agree to that.

== Background ==
Matt Parker's initial impetus for writing a book about trigonometry came from his perception that it is "the most advanced math that most people were forced to learn at some point and so it's become this kind of mascot for math is hard and pointless and awful." He initially proposed a book for the general public about trigonometry approximately ten years prior to the publication of Love Triangle. At that time, his publisher Penguin Random House were not convinced of the merits of Parker's idea.

When many years later, such a book still had not been published by anyone, Parker was unsure if that market gap needed to be filled or that "it was a terrible idea and that's why no one had done it." When he began writing Love Triangle, he had a general outline in mind, but worried that he would not have enough chapters or sufficient material for some of the chapters. His concern was unfounded, however, and he ended up having to cut out sections because his research had uncovered "so many amazing stories about geometry and trigonometry."

== Reception ==
Love Triangle debuted on The New York Times Best Sellers list in the category of Hardcover Nonfiction at #14 in the week of September 8, 2024.

Reviewers agree that Love Triangle is filled with humor. Kirkus Reviews praises Matt Parker as having "a gift for making somewhat tedious topics not only comprehensible and absorbing, but also great fun." Terry Freedman found the book to be "full of ‘dad jokes’ on steroids."

Opinions on the amount of background mathematical knowledge the reader needs to enjoy the book are mixed. In a UK review, The Times acknowledges that "this book is not for everyone" but promises that "those who persevere will end up smarter than they were when they started it." Siobhan Roberts from the Wall Street Journal suggests that "a teacher could easily triangulate numerous fascinating and fun lesson plans from" the book.

== Author biography ==
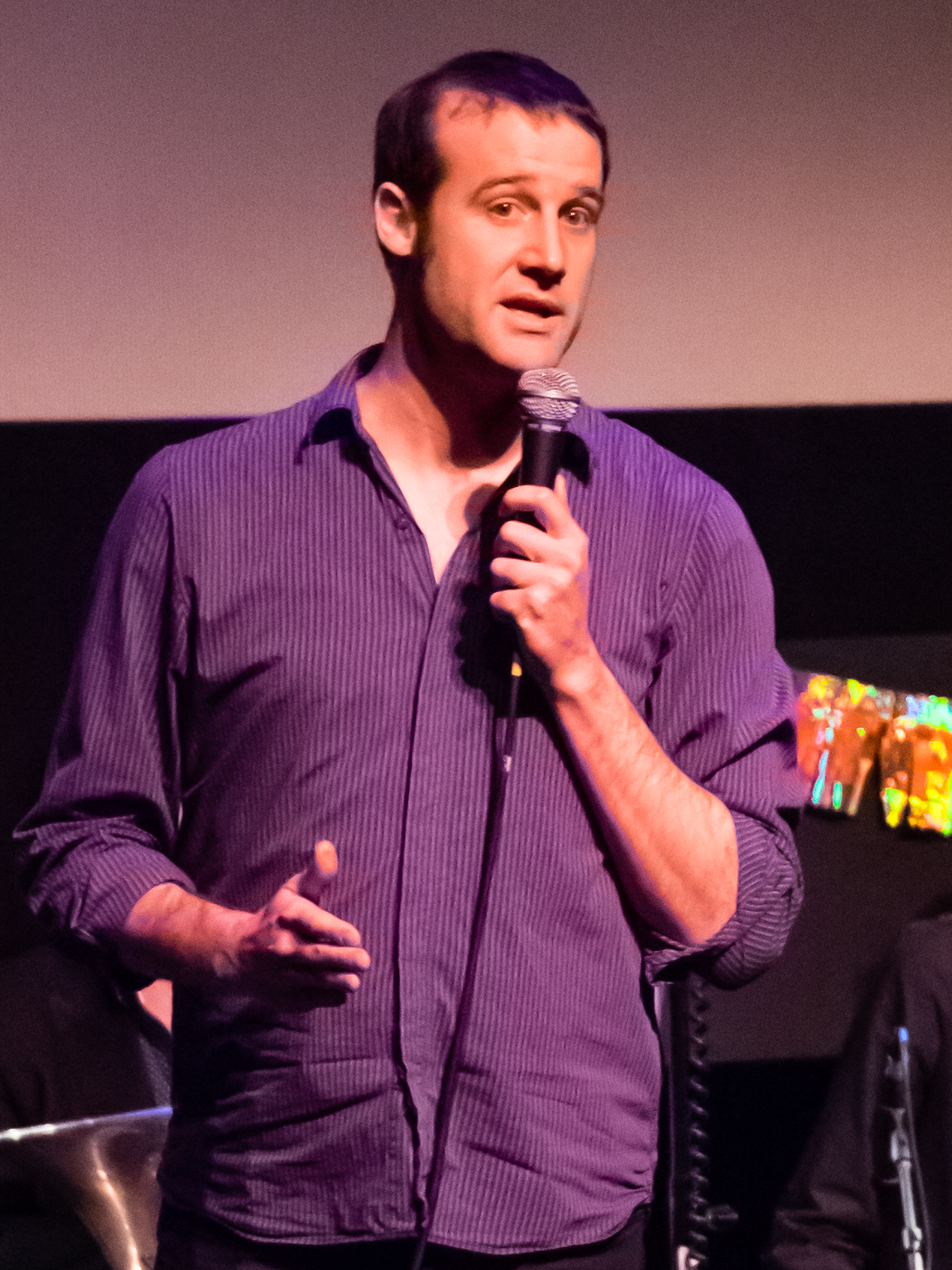
Matt Parker at Nine Lessons and Carols for Godless People

Matt Parker describes himself as a "stand-up mathematician", combining his career as a stand-up comedian and his background as a mathematics teacher. He is from Australia, but now lives and performs in the United Kingdom. He has authored math articles for The Guardian, hosted Outrageous Acts of Science on the Science Channel, and appeared on several BBC shows. His YouTube channel Stand-Up Maths has over one million views. He is also the author of Things to Make and Do in the Fourth Dimension (2014) and Humble Pi: When Math Goes Wrong in the Real World (2019).
