= Myke Hurley =

British Podcaster

- Born: Michael Hurley; 31 January 1988 (age 38)
- Occupation: Podcaster
- Years active: 2009–present
- Known for: Co-founder of Relay (podcast network)
- Spouse: Adina Hurley
- Children: 1

Michael "Myke" Hurley (born 31 January 1988) is a British professional podcaster residing in London. He co-founded the podcast network Relay in 2014, along with the Memphis-based podcaster Stephen Hackett; and Cortex Brand in 2019 with CGP Grey.

== Career ==
In 2009, Hurley started his first podcast, where he interviewed people in the tech industry. In 2011, Hurley formed the podcasting network 70Decibels, which was purchased by the 5by5 network in March 2013.

In 2014, he founded the podcast network Relay with Stephen Hackett. Within one year, the network featured 16 different shows and delivered 1.5 million downloads per month.

In 2016, Apple featured Hurley in its podcast series Events at the Apple Store, and Business Insider listed him in the UK Tech 100.

In September 2016, Hurley started a vlogging channel on YouTube. Hurley was dubbed the 'Podcasting Don' by Business Insider when returning Hurley to the UK Tech 100 in 2018.

== Podcasts ==
=== Current ===
Some podcasts currently hosted by Hurley are listed below.

- Analog(ue), with co-host Casey Liss
- BONANZA, with co-host Matt Alexander
- Connected, with co-hosts Stephen M. Hackett and Federico Viticci
- Cortex, with co-host CGP Grey
- Designed in California, with co-host Jason Snell
- The Backmarkers, with co-host Austin Evans
- The Pen Addict, with co-host Brad Dowdy
- Upgrade, with co-host Jason Snell

=== Former ===
Some podcasts formerly hosted by Hurley are listed below.

- Bionic, with co-host Matt Alexander
- CMD+Space
- Inquisitive
- Remaster, with co-hosts Shahid Kamal and Federico Viticci
- Myke at the Movies, with co-hosts Casey Liss and Jason Snell. Hosted on The Incomparable.
- Playing for Fun, with co-host Tiffany Arment
- The Prompt, with co-hosts Stephen M. Hackett and Federico Viticci
- The Ring Post, with co-hosts Dave Tach and Henry T. Casey. Hosted on The Incomparable.
- The Test Drivers, with co-host Austin Evans
- Virtual, with co-host Federico Viticci
- Ungeniused, with co-host Stephen M. Hackett (on hiatus as of 10 December 2024)
