= Christopher Zeeman Medal for Communication of Mathematics =

English biennial mathematics award

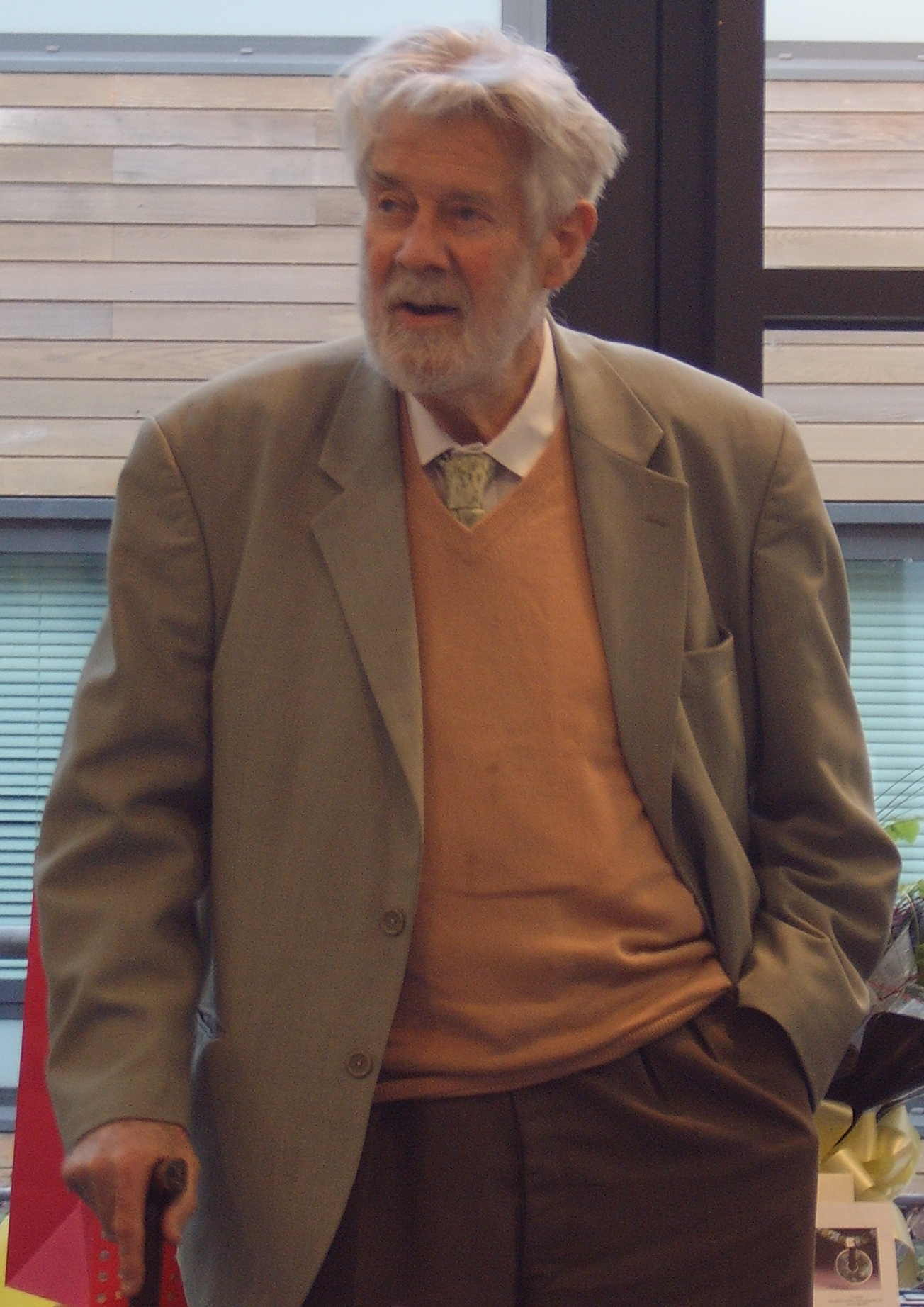
Professor Sir Christopher Zeeman in 2009, the Christopher Zeeman Medal is named in his honour.

The Christopher Zeeman Medal for Communication of Mathematics of the Institute of Mathematics and its Applications (IMA) and the London Mathematical Society (LMS), often simply called the Christopher Zeeman Medal, is a biennial prize established in 2008 jointly by the IMA and LMS "to recognise and acknowledge the contributions of mathematicians involved in promoting mathematics to the public and engaging with the public in mathematics in the UK, and demonstrate that such activities are valued by the societies and the mathematical community at large and are a part of a mathematician’s roles and responsibilities". These contributions may take several different forms, including "both direct and indirect activities with the public, the use of mass media, engaging the public in debate, writing of books or media columns, or organising major events promoting engagement with mathematics".

The award is issued on even-numbered years, with its partner IMA-LMS prize, the David Crighton Medal, issued on odd-numbered years.

== Rationale ==
The medal was first awarded in 2008 by Sir Christopher Zeeman, FRS, who "became the first mathematician to deliver the Royal Institution’s Christmas Lectures, and his ‘Mathematics into Pictures’ series is now cited as an important influence to many young mathematicians". The IMA and LMS wished to honour his legacy by recognising fellow mathematics popularisers and pioneers of public mathematics engagement.

== Prize winners list ==
Source: Institute of Mathematics and its Applications

- 2008 Ian Stewart, FRS CMath FIMA
- 2011 John D. Barrow, FRS
- 2014 Marcus du Sautoy, OBE FRS
- 2016 Rob Eastaway
- 2018 Hannah Fry, HonFREng FIMA FIET
- 2020 Matt Parker
- 2022 Simon Singh, MBE
- 2024 Brady Haran, OAM
- 2026 Alex Bellos

== See also ==
- List of mathematics awards
