= Mohammad Sami (professor) =

Indian theoretical physicist and cosmologist (b. 1955)

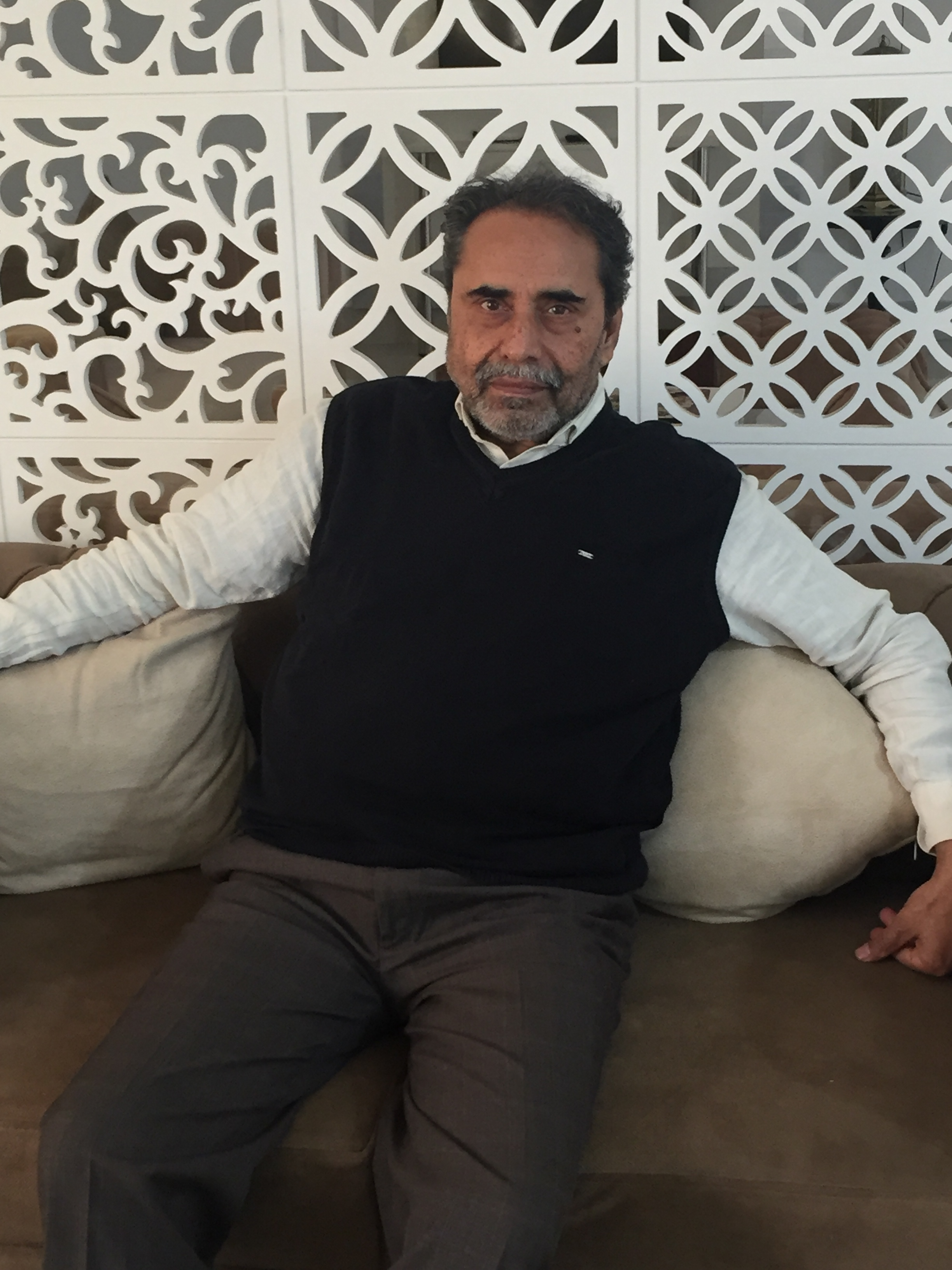
- Prof. M. Sami
- Born: February 5, 1955 (age 71); Dadheru Khurd, Muzaffarnagar, Uttar Pradesh, India
- Education: Peoples' Friendship University of Russia; Moscow State University
- Known for: Work on Dynamics of dark energy
- Spouse: Najma (m. 1985-Present)
- Children: 2 (Sarah and Sasha)
- Awards: President of India Visitor’s Award (2015)
- Scientific career
- Fields: Astrophysics, Cosmology, Physics
- Workplaces: Jamia Millia Islamia; IUCAA; Nagoya University; International Centre for Theoretical Physics
- Doctoral advisor: V. Ya. Fainberg
- Other academic advisors: Jayant Narlikar; Alexei A. Starobinsky

Mohammad Sami, FASc and FNASc (born 5 February 1955) is an Indian theoretical physicist and cosmologist, known for his work on dark energy. In 2011, his research paper titled, "Dynamics of Dark Energy", co-authored with Edmund J Copeland and Shinji Tsujikawa, was included in the Nobel Prize Committee Document.

== Early life and education ==
Sami was selected for the Indo-USSR scholarship in 1972 for higher education while pursuing Bachelor of Science (BSc) in Aligarh Muslim University, Uttar Pradesh, India. He studied at the Department of Theoretical Physics at People's Friendship University, Moscow, Russia. After attaining Master of Science (MSc), he shifted to the Moscow State University in 1979 and pursued PhD in High Energy Physics under professor V. Ya. Fainberg, a theoretical physicist. The topic was “Higgs Boson Production in lepton-lepton and hadron-hadron Collisions”.

== Career ==
Sami completed his PhD in 1983 and joined the Savitribai Phule Pune University (SPPU). In 1985, he joined Jamia Millia Islamia as a lecturer in physics. In 2002, he was invited to the Inter-University Centre for Astronomy and Astrophysics (IUCAA) in Pune as a visiting scientist for a period of three years.

In 2006, the Centre for Theoretical Physics (CTP) was established at Jamia Millia Islamia and he was appointed its first director. He engaged in teaching and research for more than three decades. He is a visiting professor at the Maulana Azad National Urdu University, Hyderabad and the Zhejiang University of Technology, China.

At the IUCAA, he was a member of the governing board. At the BRICS Association of Gravity, Astrophysics and Cosmology (BRICS-AGAC), he was one of the vice presidents from India. He is the editor of International Journal of Modern Physics D (IJMPD) and Galaxies (MDPI). He has been selected as a visiting professor of the Chinese Academy of Sciences, President's International fellowship initiative.

He is a fellow of the National Academy of Sciences and Indian Academy of Sciences. He has been a visiting scientist at the European Organization for Nuclear Research (CERN) in Geneva, the National Tsing Hua University in Taiwan, the Kavli Institute for the Physics and Mathematics of the Universe at the University of Tokyo in Japan, the Eurasian National University in Kazakhstan, the Japan Society for the Promotion of Science at the Nagoya University in Japan, and is a senior associate at the Abdus Salam International Centre for Theoretical Physics (ICTP) in Italy.

He has undertaken various national and international research projects with the Department of Science and Technology, government of India.

In 2011, his research paper on 'Dynamics of Dark Energy', co-authored with Edmund J Copeland and Shinji Tsujikawa, was published in the International Journal of Modern Physics and included in the Nobel Prize Committee Document.

Currently, he is a professor at the Center for Cosmology and Science Popularization at the Shree Guru Gobind Singh Tricentenary University (SGT University) in Gurugram, India.

== Awards and distinctions ==
In 2015, Sami and his team, the Cosmology and Astrophysics Research Group at the Centre for Theoretical Physics in Jamia Millia Islamia, was conferred the Visitor's Award by the President of India for research conducted in the field of contemporary issues in cosmology and astrophysics. The research group included Sami, Sanjay Jhingan, Anjan Ananda Sen, and Sushant G. Ghosh.

In 2018, Padma Vibhushan recipient Jayant Vishnu Narlikar nominated Sami for Padma Shri in the field of science and technology.
