= Dan Moren =

American journalist, science fiction author, and podcaster

- Born: 1980 (age 45–46)
- Education: Cornell University
- Occupations: Novelist; journalist; podcaster
- Writing career
- Period: 2017–present (fiction)
- Genres: Science fiction, spy fiction
- Notable work: Galactic Cold War series
- Website: dmoren.com

Dan Moren is an American writer, journalist, and podcaster. He is the author of the Galactic Cold War series of science-fiction spy novels and the supernatural detective novel All Souls Lost, and was formerly a senior editor at the technology magazine Macworld. He is the East Coast bureau chief of the Apple-focused website Six Colors and co-hosts several technology podcasts.

== Early life and education ==
Moren graduated from Cornell University in 2002 with a bachelor's degree in English.

== Career ==
=== Journalism and podcasting ===
Moren worked at Macworld for close to a decade, serving as a senior editor and covering Apple product launches and reviewing successive versions of iOS. He left the magazine in 2014 to work as a freelance technology journalist. His writing has appeared in The Boston Globe, Popular Science, Fast Company, Tom's Guide, and TidBITS, among other publications, and he is the co-author of the guide The Connected Apple Family.

In 2014, Moren joined Six Colors, a subscription-supported website covering Apple and technology founded by his former Macworld colleague Jason Snell, where he serves as East Coast bureau chief. He co-hosts the technology podcasts Clockwise (with Mikah Sargent) and The Rebound, writes and hosts the quiz show Inconceivable!, and is a regular panelist on the pop-culture podcast The Incomparable.

=== Fiction ===
Moren's debut novel, The Caledonian Gambit, a space-opera espionage story, was published in 2017 by Talos Press, an imprint of Skyhorse Publishing. Publishers Weekly called the debut a competent space adventure, finding its political backdrop bland but praising the planning and pacing of its action sequences and its characterization.

He followed it with the Galactic Cold War, a series of science-fiction spy novels published by Angry Robot and set against a cold war between two interstellar powers: The Bayern Agenda (2019), The Aleph Extraction (2020), The Nova Incident (2022), and The Armageddon Protocol (2024). The series follows a covert-operations team led by the agent Simon Kovalic, and reviewers have noted its deliberate evocation of Golden Age science fiction and Cold War–era spy fiction. Publishers Weekly reviewed the series favorably, awarding a starred review to The Aleph Extraction, which it described as grounded by strong team dynamics, and praising The Nova Incident for capitalizing on the crew's complex relationships. In 2023 Moren published the supernatural detective novel All Souls Lost.

In 2019, Publishers Weekly named Moren one of "10 Authors Shaking Up Space Opera." Moren has an entry as a notable science-fiction author in The Encyclopedia of Science Fiction.

== Personal life ==
Moren lives in Somerville, Massachusetts, with his family. In 2025, he became a two-time champion on the quiz show Jeopardy!.

== Bibliography ==
=== Galactic Cold War series ===
- The Caledonian Gambit (Talos Press, 2017)
- The Bayern Agenda (Angry Robot, 2019)
- The Aleph Extraction (Angry Robot, 2020)
- The Nova Incident (Angry Robot, 2022)
- The Armageddon Protocol (Angry Robot, 2024)

The series also includes several shorter works, including the novellas Pilot Error (2020), Showdown (2020), Homecoming (2022), and Sleeping Wolves (2024).

=== Other works ===
- All Souls Lost (2023)
- The Connected Apple Family (co-author, non-fiction)
