= Edmund Copeland =

Professor of physics

- Born: Edmund J. Copeland
- Citizenship: British
- Education: Newcastle University
- Known for: Science outreach; Sixty Symbols
- Awards: Wolfson Research Merit Award; Rayleigh Medal and Prize (2013)
- Scientific career
- Fields: Particle Cosmology
- Workplaces: University of Sussex; University of Nottingham
- Thesis: Quantum aspects of Kaluza-Klein cosmologies (1985)
- Doctoral advisor: Paul Davies
- Website: nottingham.ac.uk/physics/people/ed.copeland

Edmund "Ed" J. Copeland (/ˈkoʊplənd/) is a theoretical physicist, cosmologist, and professor of physics working in the Faculty of Science at the University of Nottingham, United Kingdom. Copeland won the 2013 Rayleigh Medal and Prize awarded by the Institute of Physics for his work on particle/string cosmology. He obtained his PhD from the University of Newcastle upon Tyne in 1985, with the thesis Quantum Aspects of Kaluza–Klein Cosmologies.

Copeland is well known for his appearances on the physics-popularizing YouTube channel Sixty Symbols, as well as the mathematics-popularizing channel Numberphile.
