= Federico Ardila =

Colombian mathematician

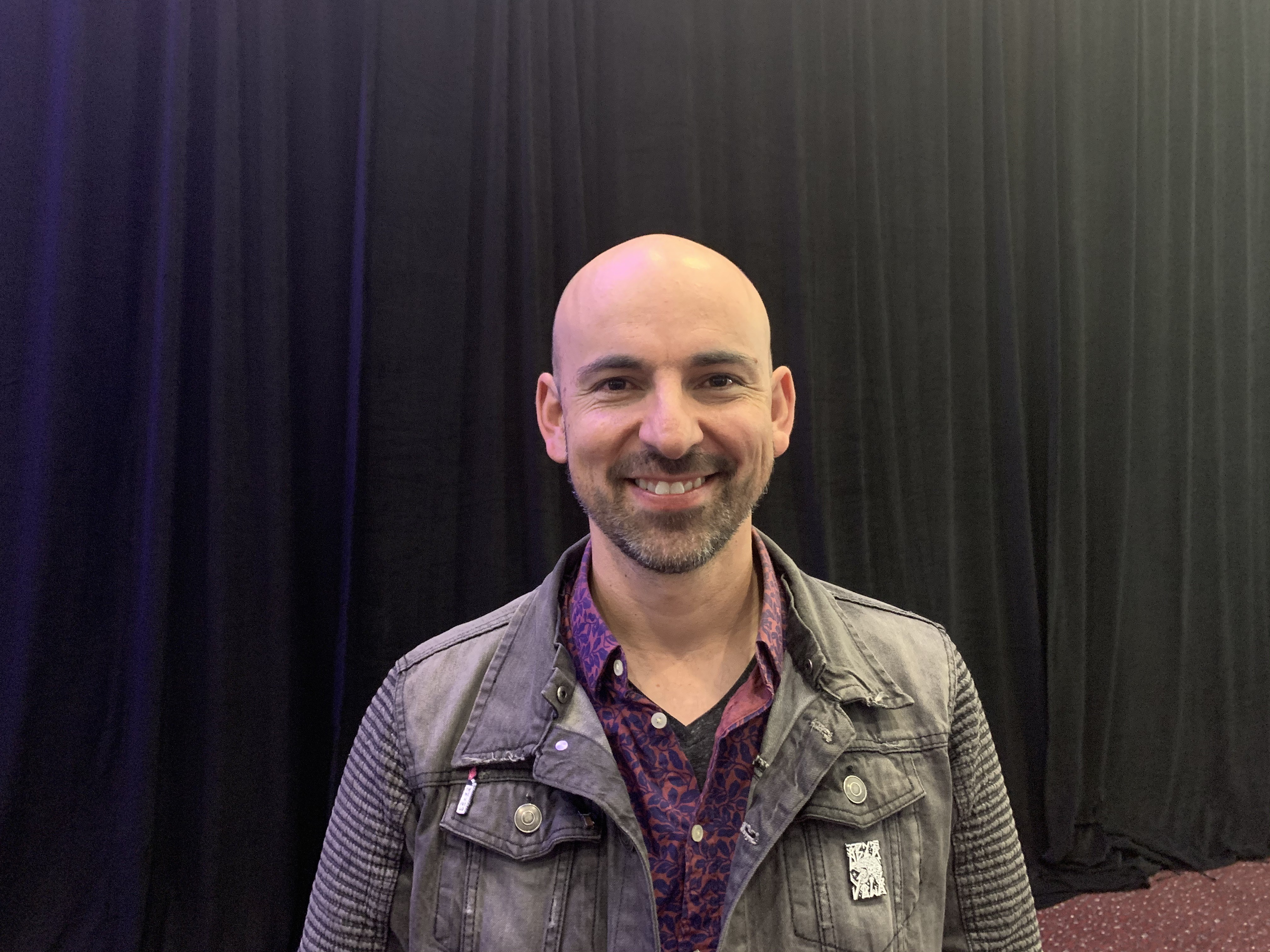
- Ardila at the 2020 Joint Math Meetings.
- Born: 1977 (age 48–49); Bogotá, Colombia
- Education: Massachusetts Institute of Technology (BSc, PhD)
- Spouse: May-Li Khoe
- Awards: Deborah and Franklin Haimo Awards for Distinguished College or University Teaching of Mathematics (2020); Simons Foundation Fellowship in Mathematics (2019–2020); Premio Nacional de Matemáticas of the Colombian Mathematical Society (2019); Fellow of the American Mathematical Society (2018); National Science Foundation CAREER Award (2010–2016)
- Scientific career
- Fields: Algebraic combinatorics
- Workplaces: San Francisco State University; University of the Andes; Queen Mary University of London
- Thesis: Enumerative and Algebraic Aspects of Matroids and Hyperplane Arrangements (2003)
- Doctoral advisor: Richard P. Stanley
- Website: math.sfsu.edu/faculty/ardila

Federico Ardila (born 1977) is a Colombian mathematician who is also active as a DJ. His research is in combinatorics, with a focus on matroid theory. Ardila is currently a professor at Queen Mary University of London, and has also held roles at San Francisco State University and the University of the Andes.

== Early life and education ==
Ardila was born in Bogotá, Colombia. While at Colegio San Carlos, Ardila represented Colombia twice in the International Mathematical Olympiad, winning bronze in 1993 and silver in 1994.

Ardila earned a degree in mathematics from MIT in 1998 and completed his PhD in 2003 under Richard P. Stanley.

Beyond mathematics, Ardila is a co-founder of the DJ collective, La Pelanga.

== Career ==
Ardila has written about increasing representation in mathematics and proposed principles for inclusive learning environments, which he calls 'The Axioms'.

He established the SFSU-Colombia Combinatorics Initiative, a collaborative program between San Francisco State University and the Universidad de los Andes, and "Todos Cuentan," a community-based project aimed at supporting mathematicians from underrepresented backgrounds. He has published over 200 hours of free lectures and mathematical resources online. He has also made several appearances in the mathematical YouTube video series Numberphile.

== Awards ==
- One of the Deborah and Franklin Haimo Awards for Distinguished College or University Teaching of Mathematics (2020)
- Simons Foundation Fellowship in Mathematics (2019–2020)
- Premio Nacional de Matemáticas of the Colombian Mathematical Society (2019)
- Fellow of the American Mathematical Society (2018)
- National Science Foundation CAREER Award (2010–2016)

== Selected writings ==
- The Bergman complex of a matroid and phylogenetic trees (2003), with Carly Klivans
- Lagrangian geometry of matroids (2020), with Graham Denham and June Huh
- CAT(0) geometry, robots, and society (2019)
- Hopf monoids and generalized permutahedra (2017), with Marcelo Aguiar
- Todos Cuentan: Cultivating Diversity in Combinatorics z(2003)
