= Humans Need Not Apply =

2014 internet video by CGP Grey

- Produced by: CGP Grey
- Release date: 13 August 2014
- Running time: 15:01
- Country: United Kingdom
- Language: English

Humans Need Not Apply is a 2014 internet video directed, produced, written, and edited by CGP Grey. It focuses on the future of the integration of automation and especially artificial intelligence into economics, as well as the impact of this integration to the worldwide workforce. It was released online on YouTube on 13 August 2014. It was later made available via iTunes and RSS. It was later renamed to What Happened to Horses Is Happening to Us.

== Premise ==
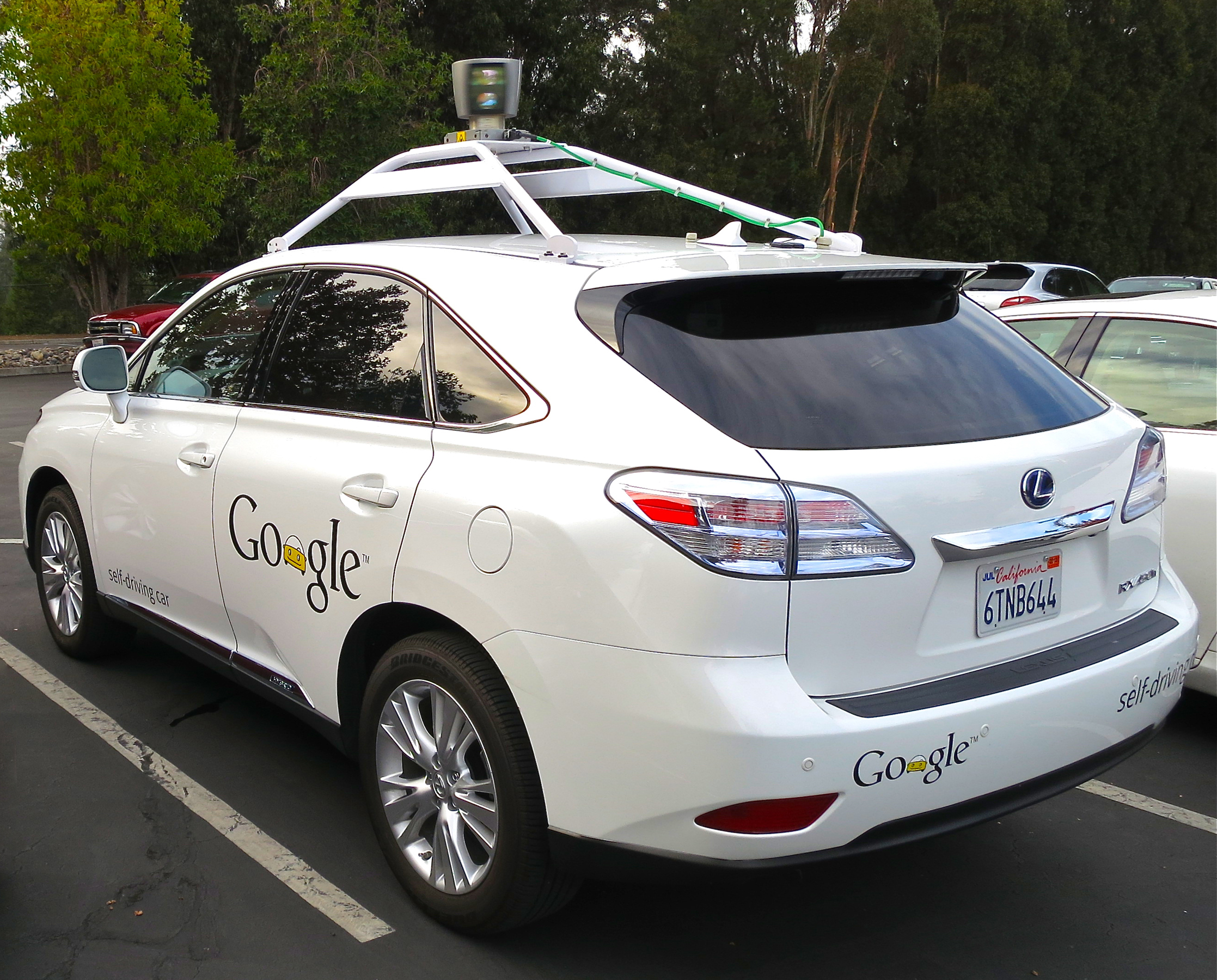
A Lexus RX 450h retrofitted as a self-driving car by Google photographed in 2012

The video focuses on the topic of robots and artificial intelligence rapidly increasing in usefulness through human society, discussing how automation will lead to a future where human labour is no longer needed.

Early on, an analogy is made describing how humans once displaced horses from their jobs (by creating mechanical muscles such as automobiles), dismissing the argument that humans will always find new work, seeing as horses are not used nearly as much now. This analogy finishes by connecting the creation of mechanical minds, or "brain labor", to robots ousting humans from their occupations. Grey also discusses how economics is the force behind a future based upon automation.

Grey concludes by stating that at the very least 45% of jobs could be replaced by bots, a figure which is inclusive of professional, white-collar and low-skill occupations, and higher than the 25% unemployment figure of the Great Depression. To take one specific example, the video states that there are 3 million driving jobs in the United States and 70 million worldwide (extrapolated from the United States figure). Grey further states that even creative occupations are not secure, mentioning the AI-composed music in the background of his video.

Additionally, the viewer is reminded that the video is not discussing or portraying a future based upon science fiction, using examples such as Baxter, self-driving cars (referred to as autos in the video) and IBM's Watson.

== Production and funding ==
The film was funded through Subbable, a crowdfunding website. Grey used this website as a means to support his projects before moving to Subbable's successor, Patreon.

== Reception and legacy ==
Humans Need Not Apply was covered by several publications, including Business Insider, The Huffington Post and Forbes. Coverage of the video complimented its presentation, calling the video "well-produced". These publications also praised its premise, calling it "thought-provoking", and "compelling", but also maintaining that the points and topics brought up in the video were "terrifying". Bruce Kasanoff of Forbes commented that the video was "sobering", and "suggests, in a convincing fashion, that many human jobs will disappear over the coming years, because automation will do them faster, better, and cheaper." The Verge commented, "The video may be too pessimistic by the end, but the thesis still stands." Vice Motherboard said, "The rather depressing video makes a strong case for why just about zero jobs are safe, and it's high time we wise up to that fact." World Futures Review called the film's treatment of the topic "brilliantly described".

After a few days of release, the video reached one million views. As of June 2026, Humans Need Not Apply has reached over 18 million views. It has also received over 400,000 likes as of September 2025.

== See also ==
- Luddites
- Technological unemployment
- Technophobia
- Artificial general intelligence
- Robotics
