= Magic square of squares =

Unsolved problem in mathematics

Unsolved problem in mathematics
Is it possible to construct a three-by-three magic square from nine distinct integer squares?
More unsolved problems in mathematics

The magic square of squares is an unsolved problem in mathematics which asks whether it is possible to construct a three-by-three magic square, the elements of which are all square numbers. The problem was first posed by Martin LaBar in the January 1984 College Mathematics Journal, before being included in Richard Guy's Unsolved problems in number theory (2nd edition) in 1994.

The problem has been a popular choice for recreational mathematicians following two articles Martin Gardner published in Quantum Magazine on the problem, offering a prize of US$100 in 1996. Other prizes have subsequently been offered for the first solution.

== Background ==
The smallest (and unique up to rotation and reflection) non-trivial case of a magic square, order 3

A magic square is a square array of integer numbers in which each row, column, and diagonal sums to the same number. The order of the square refers to the number of integers along each side. A trivial magic square is a magic square which has at least one repeated element, and a semimagic square is a magic square in which the rows and columns, but not both diagonals, sum to the same number.

== Problem ==
The problem asks whether it is possible to construct a third-order magic square such that every element is itself a square number. A square which solves the problem would thus be of the form

$x_1^2$	$x_2^2$	$x_3^2$
$x_4^2$	$x_5^2$	$x_6^2$
$x_7^2$	$x_8^2$	$x_9^2$

and satisfy the following equations

$$\begin{align}
x^2_1+x^2_2+x^2_3&=x^2_4+x^2_5+x^2_6\\
&=x^2_7+x^2_8+x^2_9\\
&=x^2_1+x^2_5+x^2_9\\
&=x^2_3+x^2_5+x^2_7\\
&=x^2_1+x^2_4+x^2_7\\
&=x^2_2+x^2_5+x^2_8\\
&=x^2_3+x^2_6+x^2_9
\end{align}$$

== Current research ==
It has been shown that the problem is equivalent to several other problems.

1. Do there exist three arithmetic progressions such that each has three terms, each has the same difference between terms as the other two, the terms are all perfect squares, and the middle terms of the three arithmetic progressions themselves form an arithmetic progression?
2. Do there exist three rational right triangles with the same area, such that the squares of the hypotenuses are in arithmetic progression?
3. Does there exist an elliptic curve, $y^2=x^3-n^2x$, where $n$ is a congruent number, with three rational points on the curve, $(x_1,y_1)$, $(x_2,y_2)$, $(x_3,y_3)$, such that each point is "double" another rational point on the curve ("double" in the sense of the group structure for points on an elliptic curve), and $x_1$, $x_2$ and $x_3$ are in arithmetic progression?

=== Properties of a magic square of squares ===
Let $S$ denote the sum of each row, column or main diagonals of a primitive (the greatest common divisor of all entries is 1) third-order magic square of squares. If such a magic square of squares exists, it must satisfy the following properties.

- All elements must be odd.
- More specifically, they must be of the form $24k+1$.
- $S = 3a^2$ where $a^2$is the middle element.
- $S$ must thus be of the form $S = 72 k+3$.
- No element can have a prime divisor $p$ of the form $p = 8k+3$.
- All prime divisors $p$ of the middle element must be of the form $p = 4k+1$.
- A prime $p$ of the form $p = 8k+5$ cannot divide a non-corner edge element.
- If a prime $p$ of the form $p = 4k+3$ divides a corner element then it must also divide the two non-corner edge elements that are not adjacent to that corner.
- If a prime $p$ of the form $p = 8k+5$ divides a corner element then it must also divide the center element and the opposite corner element.

Brute force searches for solutions have been unsuccessful, and suggest that if a solution exists, it would consist of numbers greater than at least $10^{14}$.

Rice University professor of mathematics Anthony Várilly-Alvarado has expressed his doubt as to the existence of the magic square of squares.

== Notable attempts ==
There have been a number of attempts to construct a magic square of squares by recreational mathematicians.

=== Sallows' Square ===
Following Gardner's prize offer for anyone who could find a magic square of squares in 1996, Lee Sallows published his attempt in The Mathematical Intelligencer. His attempt is unique in that all of the rows and columns, and one of the diagonals, all sum to the same square number.

Sallows' Square
	127^{2}	46^{2}	58^{2}	**147^{2}**
	2^{2}	113^{2}	94^{2}	**147^{2}**
	74^{2}	82^{2}	97^{2}	**147^{2}**
**147^{2}**	**147^{2}**	**147^{2}**	**147^{2}**	**38307**

=== Bremner Square ===
In 1999, Andrew Bremner published his attempt at the problem, and further research surrounding magic squares of squares. Bremner's attempt differs from others in that not all elements of the square are square numbers, while all the rows, columns and diagonals sum to the same number.

Bremner Square
	373^{2}	289^{2}	565^{2}	**541875**
	360721	425^{2}	23^{2}	**541875**
	205^{2}	527^{2}	222121	**541875**
**541875**	**541875**	**541875**	**541875**	**541875**

=== Parker square ===
The Parker square is an attempt by Matt Parker to solve the problem. His solution is a trivial, semimagic square of squares, as $41^2$, $29^2$ and $1^2$ all appear twice, and the diagonal $23^2+37^2+47^2$ sums to 4107 instead of 3051.

The Parker Square, with sums shown in bold.
	29^{2}	1^{2}	47^{2}	**3051**
	41^{2}	37^{2}	1^{2}	**3051**
	23^{2}	41^{2}	29^{2}	**3051**
**4107**	**3051**	**3051**	**3051**	**3051**

== Non third-order magic squares of squares ==
Magic squares of squares of orders greater than 3 have been known since as early as 1770, when Leonhard Euler sent a letter to Joseph-Louis Lagrange detailing a fourth-order magic square.

Euler's magic square of squares
68^{2}	29^{2}	41^{2}	37^{2}
17^{2}	31^{2}	79^{2}	32^{2}
59^{2}	28^{2}	23^{2}	61^{2}
11^{2}	77^{2}	8^{2}	49^{2}

Multimagic squares are magic squares which remain magic after raising every element to some power. In 1890, Georges Pfeffermann published a solution to a problem he posed involving the construction of an eighth-order 2-multimagic square.

Pfeffermann's eighth order 2-multimagic square
	56	34	8	57	18	47	9	31	260
	33	20	54	48	7	29	59	10	260
	26	43	13	23	64	38	4	49	260
	19	5	35	30	53	12	46	60	260
	15	25	63	2	41	24	50	40	260
	6	55	17	11	36	58	32	45	260
	61	16	42	52	27	1	39	22	260
	44	62	28	37	14	51	21	3	260
260	260	260	260	260	260	260	260	260	260
