= Bob Eastaway =

Australian rules footballer

Personal information
- Full name: Robert Francis Eastaway
- Born: 28 January 1943
- Died: 3 August 2008 (aged 65)
- Original team: Preston Juniors
- Height: 179 cm (5 ft 10 in)
- Weight: 75 kg (165 lb)

Playing career^{1}
Years	Club	Games (Goals)
1962	Fitzroy	2 (0)
- ^{1} Playing statistics correct to the end of 1962.

Robert Francis Eastaway (28 January 1943 – 3 August 2008) was an Australian rules footballer who played with Fitzroy in the Victorian Football League (VFL).
