= Tadashi Tokieda =

Japanese mathematician

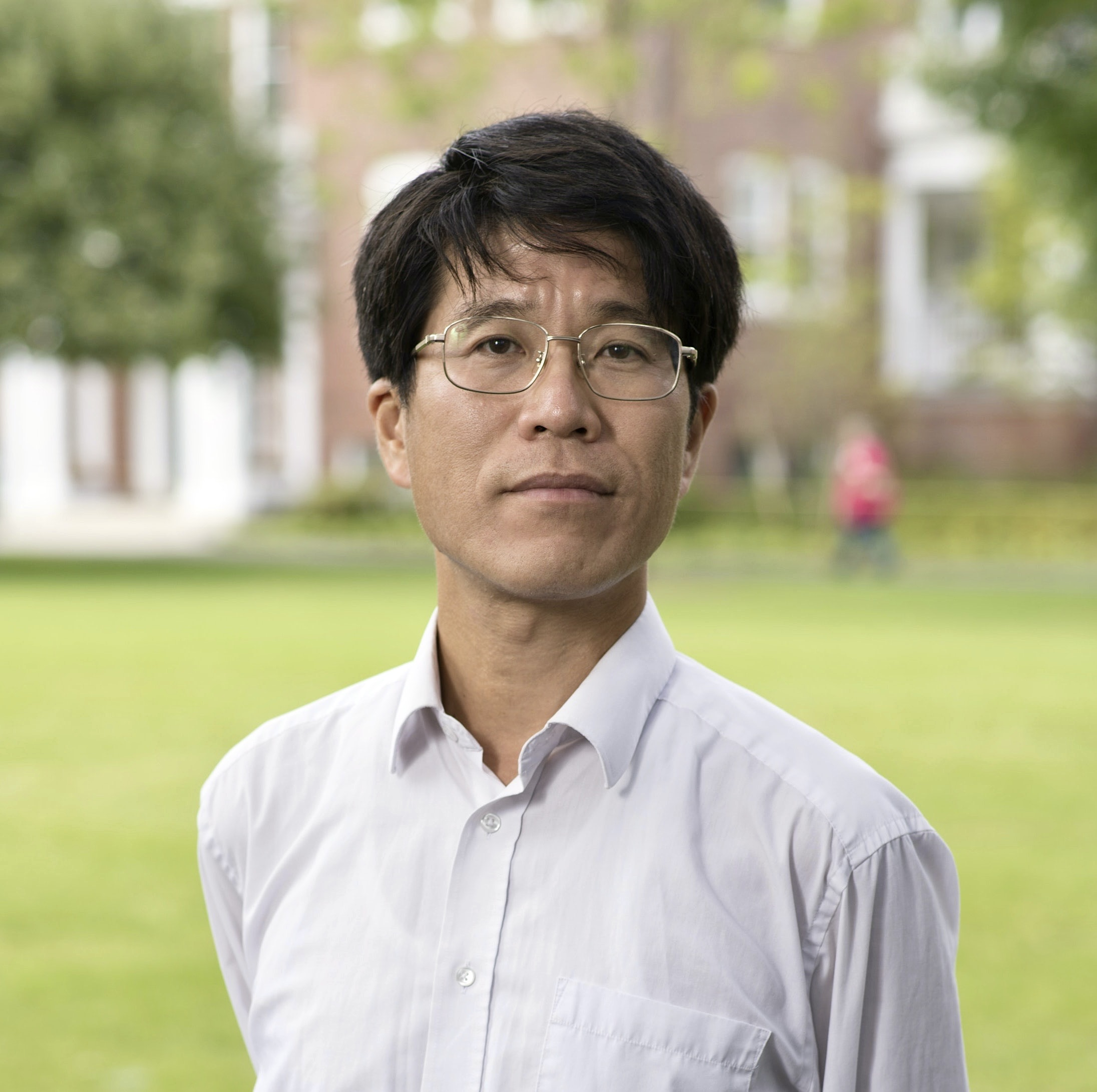
- Tokieda in 2013
- Born: 1968 (age 57–58); Tokyo, Japan
- Education: Sophia University; University of Oxford; Princeton University
- Awards: Paul R. Halmos–Lester R. Ford Award (2014)
- Scientific career
- Fields: Mathematics
- Workplaces: Princeton University; Cambridge University; Stanford University
- Thesis: Null Sets of Symplectic Capacity
- Doctoral advisor: William Browder

Tadashi Tokieda (Japanese: 時枝正; born 1968) is a Japanese mathematician, working in mathematics and physics. He is a professor of mathematics at Stanford University; he formerly was a fellow and Director of Studies of Mathematics at Trinity Hall, Cambridge. He also invents, collects, and studies toys that uniquely reveal and explore real-world surprises of mathematics and physics. In comparison with most mathematicians, he had an unusual path in life: he started as a painter, and then became a classical philologist, before transitioning to mathematics. Tokieda is known for his public lectures.

== Life and career ==
Tokieda was born in Tokyo and initially intended to be a painter. He then studied at Lycée Sainte-Marie Grand Lebrun in France as a classical philologist. According to his personal homepage, he taught himself basic mathematics from Russian collections of problems.

He is a 1989 classics graduate from Sophia University in Tokyo and has a 1991 bachelor's degree from Oxford in mathematics (where he studied as a British Council Fellow). He obtained his PhD at Princeton in 1996 under the supervision of William Browder.

Tokieda joined the University of Illinois at Urbana Champaign as a J. L. Doob Research Assistant Professor for the 1997 academic year.

He has been involved in the African Institute for Mathematical Sciences since its founding in 2003.

In 2004, he was elected a Fellow of Trinity Hall, where he became the Director of Studies in Mathematics and the Stephan and Thomas Körner Fellow.

He was the William and Flora Hewlett Foundation Fellow in 2013–2014 at the Radcliffe Institute for Advanced Study at Harvard University.

In the 2015–2016 academic year he was the Poincaré Distinguished Visiting Professor at Stanford.

Besides his native language Japanese, he is also fluent in French and English. In addition, he knows ancient Greek, Latin, classical Chinese, Finnish, Spanish, and Russian. When asked how many languages he knows, he answered "I don't really know. It's like asking how many friends you have." So far he has lived in eight countries.

In March 2020, Tokieda was interviewed on The Joy of X, Steven Strogatz's podcast for Quanta Magazine.

== Selected publications ==
- Tokieda, Tadashi (2013). "Roll Models". The American Mathematical Monthly. 120 (3): 265–282. doi:10.4169/amer.math.monthly.120.03.265. S2CID 38892886. Archived from the original on 2021-01-18.
- Childress, Stephen; Spagnolie, Saverio E.; Tokieda, Tadashi (2011). "A bug on a raft: recoil locomotion in a viscous fluid". Journal of Fluid Mechanics. 669: 527–556. Bibcode:2011JFM...669..527C. doi:10.1017/S002211201000515X. S2CID 14039767.
- Montaldi, James; Tokieda, Tadashi (2003). "Openness of momentum maps and persistence of extremal relative equilibria". Topology. 42 (4): 833–844. arXiv:math/0201282. doi:10.1016/S0040-9383(02)00047-2. S2CID 8814996.
- Aref, Hassan; Newton, Paul K.; Stremler, Mark A.; Tokieda, Tadashi; Vainchtein, Dmitri L. (2003). "Vortex Crystals". Advances in Applied Mechanics. 39: 1–79. doi:10.1016/s0065-2156(02)39001-x. ISBN 9780120020393.
- Tokieda, Tadashi (2001). "Tourbillons dansants" [Dancing Swirls]. Comptes Rendus de l'Académie des Sciences, Série I. 333 (10): 943–946. doi:10.1016/S0764-4442(01)02162-0.
- Tokieda, Tadashi (1998). "Mechanical Ideas in Geometry". The American Mathematical Monthly. 105 (8): 697–703. doi:10.2307/2588986. JSTOR 2588986.
