= Rob Eastaway =

English author

- Education: University of Cambridge
- Awards: Christopher Zeeman Medal (2016)
- Scientific career
- Fields: Mathematics
- Workplaces: Maths Inspiration; New Scientist
- Website: robeastaway.com

Rob Eastaway is an English author and speaker. He is active in the popularisation of mathematics and was awarded the Zeeman medal in 2017 for excellence in the promotion of maths. He is best known for his books, including the bestselling Why Do Buses Come in Threes? and Maths for Mums and Dads. His first book was What is a Googly?, an explanation of cricket for Americans and other newcomers to the game.

Eastaway is a keen cricketer, and has played for the Mandarins Cricket Club for many years. In 2026 he played some matches for the Authors Cricket Club. He is the founder of The Googly Fund, a charitable fund that supports adult friendly cricket in the UK. With Ted Dexter and Gordon Vince he was one of the originators of the International Rankings of Cricketers. From 2019 to 2023 he was a puzzle setter and adviser for New Scientist magazine and he has appeared frequently on BBC Radio 4 and 5 Live.

Since 2005 he has been the director of Maths Inspiration, a national programme of theatre-based lecture shows for teenagers which involves some of the UK's leading maths speakers. He was president of the UK Mathematical Association for 2007/2008. He is a former pupil of the King's School, Chester, and has a degree in engineering and management science from the University of Cambridge.

== Books ==
- 1992: What is a Googly?
- 1995: The Guinness Book of Mindbenders, co-author David Wells
- 1998: Why do Buses Come in Threes?, co-author Jeremy Wyndham, foreword by Tim Rice
- 1999: The Memory Kit
- 2002: How Long is a Piece of String?, co-author Jeremy Wyndham
- 2004: How to Remember
- 2005: How to Take a Penalty, co-author John Haigh
- 2007: How to Remember (Almost) Everything Ever
- 2007: Out of the Box
- 2008: How Many Socks Make a Pair?
- 2010: Maths for Mums and Dads, co-author Mike Askew
- 2011: The Hidden Mathematics of Sport (new edition of How to Take a Penalty)
- 2013: More Maths for Mums and Dads, co-author Mike Askew
- 2016: Maths on the Go, co-author Mike Askew
- 2017: Any ideas? Tips and Techniques to Help You Think Creatively
- 2018: 100 Maddening Mindbending Puzzles
- 2019: Maths On The Back of an Envelope
- 2023: Headscratchers - The New Scientist Puzzle Book
- 2024: Much Ado About Numbers
