= Brady Haran =

Australian-British YouTuber and journalist (born 1976)

Brady Haran OAM
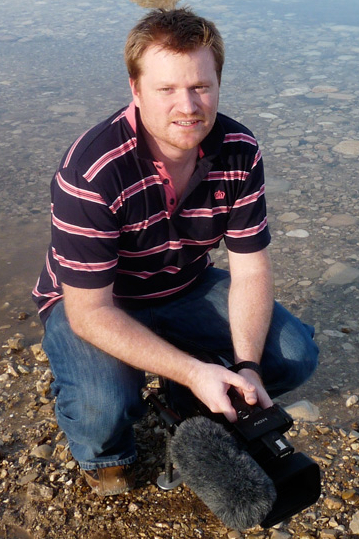
- Haran at the Dead Sea, 2013
- Born: Brady John Haran; 18 June 1976 (age 50); Glenelg, Adelaide, Australia
- Occupations: Video journalist; Documentary filmmaker; Podcaster
- Spouse: Kylie Pentelow
- Children: 1

YouTube information
- Channels: Computerphile; Numberphile; Periodic videos; Sixty Symbols
- Subscribers: 4.69 million (Numberphile); 2.58 million (Computerphile); 1.63 million (Periodic Videos); 890,000 (Sixty Symbols)
- Views: 708 million (Numberphile); 294 million (Periodic Videos); 230 million (Computerphile); 107 million (Sixty Symbols)
- Last updated: 23 October 2025
- Website: bradyharan.com

Brady John Haran (born 18 June 1976) is an Australian-British independent filmmaker and video journalist who produces educational videos and documentary films for his YouTube channels, the most notable being Periodic Videos and Numberphile. Haran is also the co-host of the Hello Internet podcast along with fellow educational YouTuber CGP Grey. On 22 August 2017, Haran launched his second podcast, called The Unmade Podcast, and on 11 November 2018, he launched his third podcast, The Numberphile Podcast, based on his mathematics-centered channel of the same name.

== Early career ==
Brady Haran studied journalism for a year before being hired by The Adelaide Advertiser. In 2002, he moved from Australia to Nottingham, United Kingdom. In Nottingham, he worked for the BBC, began to work with film, and reported for East Midlands Today, BBC News Online and BBC radio stations.

In 2007, Haran worked as a filmmaker-in-residence for Nottingham Science City, as part of an agreement between the BBC and the University of Nottingham. His "Test Tube" project started with the idea of producing a documentary about scientists and their research, but he decided to upload his raw footage to YouTube; from that point "Periodic Videos" and "Sixty Symbols" were developed. Haran then left the BBC to work full-time making YouTube videos.

== YouTube channels ==
Following Test Tube, Haran decided to create new YouTube channels. In his first five years as an independent filmmaker he made over 1500 videos and in 2012, he was the producer, editor, and interviewer behind 12 YouTube channels. Haran frequently collaborates with well-known academics and professionals. Haran's videos are often in the format of a casual interview in which Haran and an expert discuss subjects relevant to their work.

=== The Periodic Table of Videos ===
Started in June 2008, Periodic Videos is a series of videos about chemical elements and the periodic table. Working with Professor Martyn Poliakoff, Haran's videos explaining chemistry and science for non-technical persons have received positive recognition. Together, they have made over 500 short videos that cover the elements and other chemistry-related topics. Their YouTube channel has had more than 159 million views. Also, Haran and Poliakoff authored an article in the Nature Chemistry journal and an essay on Science journal discussing the impact of The Periodic Table of Videos. Martyn Poliakoff received the Royal Society of Chemistry Nyholm Prize for Education in 2011 for work taking chemistry education to a wider audience; this included his work with Haran on The Periodic Table of Videos.

=== Sixty Symbols ===
Sixty Symbols is Haran's YouTube channel for physics and astronomy. The first video was released in April 2009, with the original run of videos focusing on commonly used physics notations. Since then, videos on topics such as the greenhouse effect, the age of the universe, and several on black holes have been released.

=== Numberphile ===
Started in October 2011, Numberphile features videos that explore educational topics from a variety of fields of mathematics. It is currently Haran's most subscribed channel. In the early days of the channel, each video focused on a specific number, but the channel has since expanded its scope, featuring videos on more advanced mathematical concepts such as Fermat's Last Theorem and the Riemann hypothesis. Haran maintains the Numberphile2 channel as well, which features extra footage from the main channel, as well as The Numberphile Podcast.

=== Objectivity ===
Haran launched the YouTube channel Objectivity in late 2014. The videos feature the discussion and handling of historic objects and manuscripts, often from the archives of the Royal Society, though other historic museums and organizations have also been featured. Haran is the on-camera presenter for the channel, in contrast to his other channels where he is a behind-the-camera presence. Keith Moore, the Head Librarian of the Royal Society, is prominently featured.

=== Deep Sky Videos ===
Deep Sky Videos, started in October 2011, is Haran's astronomy-focused channel. It is similarly formatted and has some of the same contributors as Numberphile and Sixty Symbols. In September 2022, the channel finished a series of videos on each of the 110 Messier objects, which had been a goal of the channel since January 2012.

=== Other YouTube channels ===
Computerphile is the sister channel to Numberphile, featuring videos about computer science. Haran is minimally involved in the channel's video creation, with most being directed and produced by Sean Riley.

Haran continues to maintain the Test Tube channel, now titled nottinghamscience, as a place to post extra footage and outtakes from Periodic Videos and Sixty Symbols. He also runs channels for his podcasts Hello Internet and The Unmade Podcast. Haran has several channels that have been inactive for several years, which are Words of the World, Backstage Science, Psyfile, PhilosophyFile, Bibledex, FavScientist, and foodskey. Brady Stuff is Haran's channel for personal videos and is a self-described "dumping ground for clips that don't quite fit anywhere".

== Podcasts ==
=== Hello Internet ===
Hello Internet logo

Nail & Gear – chosen by the listeners in a postal referendum as the official flag of the Hello Internet podcast

In January 2014, Haran launched the podcast Hello Internet along with co-host CGP Grey, another YouTube educational content creator. The podcast peaked as the #1 iTunes podcast in the United Kingdom, United States, Germany, Canada, and Australia. It was selected as one of Apple's best new podcasts of 2014. The Guardian included the podcast among its 50 best of 2016, naming episode 66 ("A Classic Episode") its episode of the year. The paper described the podcast as having "in-depth debates and banter that is actually amusing".

The podcast features discussions pertaining to their lives as professional content creators for YouTube, as well as their interests and annoyances. Typical topics include technology etiquette; movie and TV show reviews; plane accidents; vexillology; futurology; and the differences between Grey's and Haran's personalities and lifestyles. Grey's and Haran's opinions and comments on feedback usually starts the next episode of the podcast. As a result of their conversations, Haran has been noted for reappropriating the term "freebooting", among other words, to refer to the unauthorised rehosting of online media.

The podcast has an "official" flag called the Nail & Gear which was chosen from five candidates with a postal vote by the podcast's audience using an alternative vote system.

The podcast is currently on indefinite hiatus.

=== The Unmade Podcast ===
In August 2017, Haran launched The Unmade Podcast along with co-host Tim Hein, a close friend of Haran. The podcast features a discussion between the two about "ideas for podcasts that they will never make". Most episodes last for approximately 40–75 minutes and each host is given the opportunity to pitch two podcast ideas in total. Hein and Haran then proceed to discuss these ideas in a light-hearted and often comedic manner. Along with the regular episodes, the podcast also has occasional 'special episodes'. These are usually, but not always, an opportunity for the hosts to attempt to actually create a podcast from an idea previously put forward on the show. A notable exception to this was the Antarctica special episode which departed from the usual format for Haran to discuss his recent visit to Antarctica with Hein. As of December 2020, there have been twenty special episodes including the Antarctica special.

=== The Numberphile Podcast ===
In November 2018, Haran launched The Numberphile Podcast, in which he speaks with various mathematicians in a longer-form version than the YouTube channel. Unlike with his others, Haran is the sole host of this podcast.

=== Younglings ===
In January 2023, Haran launched the podcast Younglings with his wife Kylie Pentelow, journalist Amanda Knox, and her husband Christopher Robinson. The podcast focuses on the two couples' experience with parenthood, as well as advice for new parents.

== Personal life ==
Haran lives near Bristol in the UK. He is married to journalist and TV news presenter Kylie Pentelow, with whom he has a son.

== Awards ==
- 2004 – BBC Ruby Television Awards Silver
- 2005 – BBC Ruby Television Awards Gold for 'Best Audience Generated Content'
- 2007 – BBC Ruby Television Awards Silver for work on the real life soap opera Alexandra Road
- 2008 – The Stevie Award (International Business Award) for 'Best Public Information/Interactive and Multimedia' for The University of Nottingham website test-tube.uk
- 2008 – IChemE Petronas Award for 'Excellence in Education and Training' for The Periodic Table of Videos
- 2008 – European Excellence Award for 'Podcast' for An Element for Christmas
- 2011 – Science Magazine's Prize for 'Online Resources in Education' for The Periodic Table of Videos
- 2011 – Creativity International Platinum Award for 'New Media' for The Periodic Table of Videos
- 2012 – Webby Award for 'Reality Online Film & Video' for The Periodic Table of Videos
- 2016 – Kelvin Medal for Sixty Symbols (with Michael Merrifield and Philip Moriarty)
- 2016 – Doctor of Letters (Honorary degree) – University of Nottingham
- 2017 – Radio Times Radio and Podcast Champion
- 2021 – Medal of the Order of Australia for service to the broadcast and on-line media.
- 2024 – Christopher Zeeman Medal recognising excellence in the communication of mathematics.
- 2025 – Main-belt asteroid 46925 Bradyharan named by International Astronomical Union

== Publications ==
- "YouTube in Its Element". Chemistry in Australia. 76 (10): 30–33. November 2009. ISSN 0314-4240. OCLC 4808833303. (with Martyn Poliakoff)
- "Test tube: behind the scenes in the world of science". Nottingham Science City. University of Nottingham. OCLC 753944363.
- "Teaching chem eng – Martyn Poliakoff and Brady Haran on Nottingham Uni's periodic table for the YouTube generation". The Chemical Engineer (812): 36. 2009. ISSN 0302-0797. OCLC 308533279. (with Martyn Poliakoff)
- "Fantasy games 'not for geeks'". BBC News Online. 2003. OCLC 229408792.
- Haran, Brady; Poliakoff, Martyn (21 February 2011). "How to measure the impact of chemistry on the small screen". Nature Chemistry. 3 (3): 180–182. Bibcode:2011NatCh...3..180H. doi:10.1038/nchem.990. PMID 21336314. (subscription required)
- Haran, Brady; Poliakoff, Martyn (27 May 2011). "The Periodic Table of Videos". Science. 332 (6033): 1046–1047. Bibcode:2011Sci...332.1046H. doi:10.1126/science.1196980. PMID 21617067.
