= Relay (podcast network) =

Podcast network

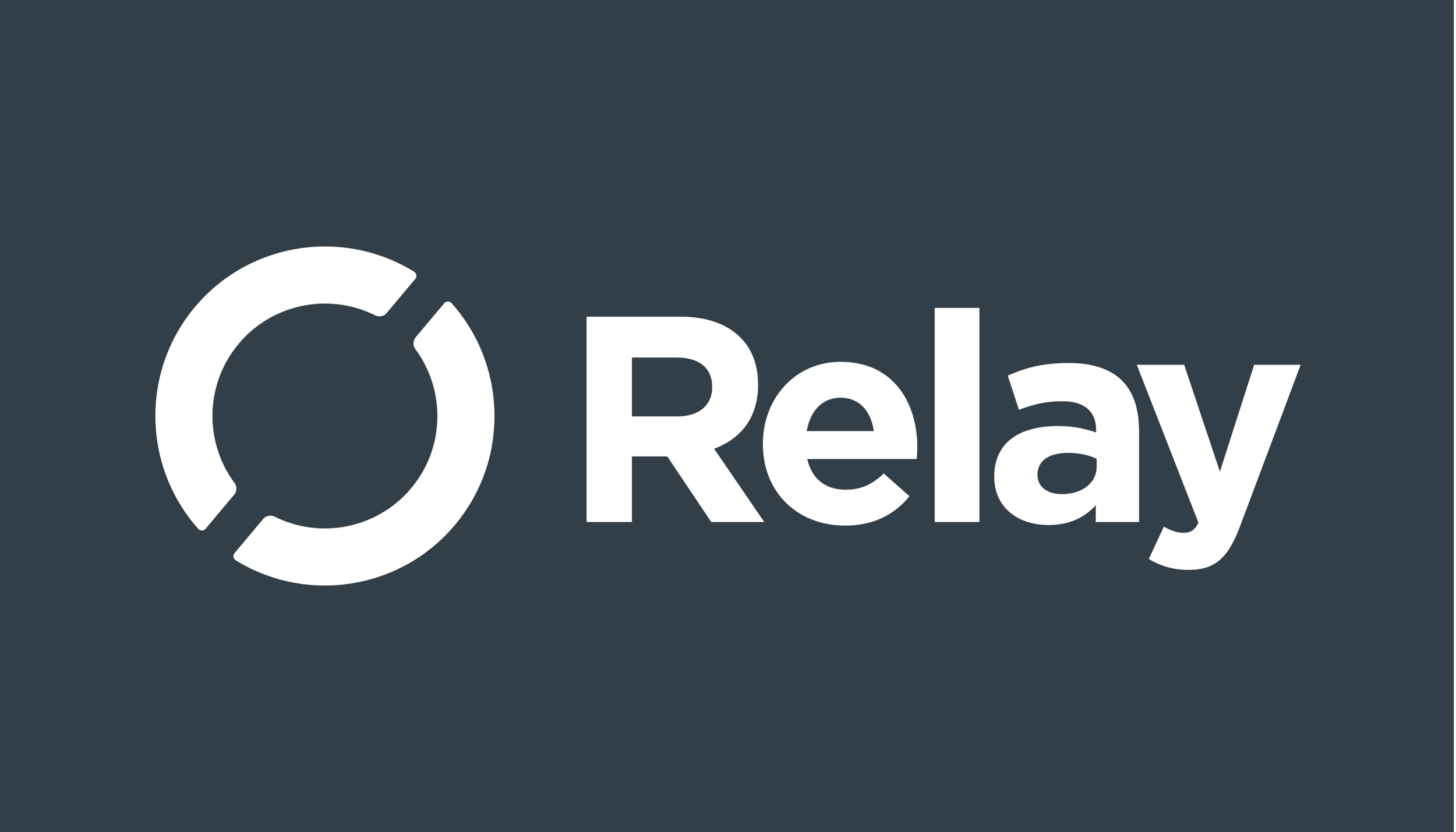
- Type: Private
- Industry: Podcast
- Founded: 2014
- Founder: Myke Hurley; Stephen Hackett
- Headquarters: United States; United Kingdom
- Number of employees: 4
- Website: relay.fm

Relay, formerly known as Relay FM, is a podcast network covering a diverse range of subjects including consumer technology, productivity, entrepreneurship, creativity, and art. It was founded in 2014 by Myke Hurley and Stephen Hackett. Starting in 2019, the network has raised money for St. Jude Children's Research Hospital each year during the month of September.

== History ==
The network launched on August 18, 2014 with five podcasts: Analog(ue), Connected, Inquisitive, The Pen Addict, and Virtual. Eventually the company expanded to 31 active podcasts on the network (including the extra B-Sides podcast consisting of before and after podcast snippets and Departures, an audio feed of live events), nine paid members only podcasts, and 17 inactive podcasts.

In October 2015, Relay FM launched its mobile application on iOS, allowing users to discover new podcasts, listen to the latest podcasts, and be notified when a podcast is broadcasting live. Users of the app can also subscribe to a podcast in their app of choice from the Relay FM app.

In September 2019, Relay FM became the first St. Jude Children's Research Hospital podcast partner. On the 20th, Hurley and Hackett hosted a 6 hour "podcastathon" to help raise money for the hospital. By the end of the month, the network had raised over $300,000. In September 2020 the network again held a fundraiser for St. Jude, bringing in $456,000.

In January 2025, the network dropped "FM" from its name, becoming known simply as Relay.
