= Woodstock of physics =

1987 American Physical Society meeting

The Woodstock of physics was the popular name given by physicists to the marathon session of the American Physical Society’s meeting on March 18, 1987, which featured 51 presentations of recent discoveries in the science of high-temperature superconductors. Various presenters anticipated that these new materials would soon result in revolutionary technological applications, but in the three subsequent decades, this proved to be overly optimistic. The name is a reference to the 1969 Woodstock Music and Art Festival.

== Leading up to the meeting ==
Before a series of breakthroughs in the mid-1980s, most scientists believed that the extremely low temperature requirements of superconductors rendered them impractical for everyday use. However, in June 1986, K. Alex Muller and Georg Bednorz working in IBM Zurich broke the record of critical temperature superconductivity in lanthanum barium copper oxide (LBCO) to 35 K above absolute zero, which had remained unbroken at 23 K for 17 years. Their discovery stimulated a great deal of additional research in high-temperature superconductivity.

By March 1987, a flurry of recent research on ceramic superconductors had succeeded in creating ever-higher superconducting temperatures, including the discovery of Maw-Kue Wu and Jim Ashburn at the University of Alabama, who found a critical temperature of 77 K in yttrium barium copper oxide (YBCO). This result was followed by Paul C. W. Chu at the University of Houston's of a superconductor that operated at 93 K (−180 °C; −292 °F) – a temperature that could be achieved by cooling with liquid nitrogen. The scientific community was abuzz with excitement.

== Events ==
The discoveries were so recent that no papers on them had been submitted by the deadline. However, the Society added a last-minute session to their annual meeting to discuss the new research. The session was chaired by physicist M. Brian Maple, a superconductor researcher himself, who was one of the meeting's organizers. It was scheduled to start at 7:30 pm in the Sutton ballroom of the New York Hilton, but excited scientists started lining up at 5:30. Key researchers such as Chu and Müller were given 10 minutes to describe their research; other physicists were given five minutes. Nearly 2,000 scientists tried to squeeze into the ballroom. Those who could not find a seat filled the aisles or watched outside the room on television monitors. The session ended at 3:15 am, but many lingered until dawn to discuss the presentations. The meeting caused a surge in mainstream media interest in superconductors, and laboratories around the world raced to pursue breakthroughs in the field.

In October of the same year, Bednorz and Muller were awarded the Nobel Prize in Physics "for their important break-through in the discovery of superconductivity in ceramic materials", setting a record for the shortest time between the discovery and the prize award for any scientific Nobel Prize category.

== Sequels ==
=== Woodstock of physics II ===
By the following year (1988) two new families of copper-oxide superconductors – the bismuth based or so-called BSCCO and the thallium based or TBCCO materials – had been discovered. Both of these have superconducting transitions above 110 K (−163 °C; −262 °F). So in the follow-up March APS meeting at New Orleans a special evening session called Woodstock of Physics-II was hastily organized to highlight the synthesis and properties of these new, first-ever 'triple digit superconductors'. The format of the session was the same as in New York. Some of the panelists were repeats from the original "Woodstock" session. Additional researchers including Allen M. Hermann (at that time at the University of Arkansas), the co-discoverer of the thallium system, and Laura H. Greene (then with AT&T Labs) were panelists. The 1988 session was chaired by Timir Datta from the University of South Carolina.

=== 20 year anniversary ===
On March 5, 2007, many of the original participants reconvened in Denver to recognize and review the session on its 20-year anniversary; the "reunion" was again chaired by Maple.

== See also ==
- List of physics conferences
