= Thallium barium calcium copper oxide =

Family of high-temperature superconductors

Schematic layered structure of TBCCO-2223.

Thallium barium calcium copper oxide, or TBCCO (pronounced "tibco"), is a family of high-temperature superconductors having the generalized chemical formula Tl_{m}Ba_{2}Ca_{n−1}Cu_{n}O_{2n+m+2}.

Tl_{2}Ba_{2}Ca_{2}Cu_{3}O_{10} (TBCCO-2223) was discovered in Prof. Allen M. Hermann's laboratory in the physics department of the University of Arkansas in October 1987 by the post-doctoral researcher Zhengzhi Sheng and Prof. Hermann. The bulk superconductivity in this material was confirmed by observations of magnetic flux expulsion and flux trapping signals (under zero field cooled and field cooled conditions) with a SQUID magnetometer in the superconductor laboratory of Timir Datta in the University of South Carolina. Allen Hermann announced his discovery and the critical temperature of 127 K, in Houston, Texas at the World Congress on Superconductivity organized by Paul Chu in February 1988.

The first series of the Tl-based superconductor containing one Tl–O layer has the general formula TlBa_{2}Ca_{n−1}Cu_{n}O_{2n+3}, whereas the second series containing two Tl–O layers has a formula of Tl_{2}Ba_{2}Ca_{n−1}Cu_{n}O_{2n+4} with n =1, 2 and 3. In the structure of Tl_{2}Ba_{2}CuO_{6} (Tl-2201), there is one CuO_{2} layer with the stacking sequence (Tl–O) (Tl–O) (Ba–O) (Cu–O) (Ba–O) (Tl–O) (Tl–O). In Tl_{2}Ba_{2}CaCu_{2}O_{8} (Tl-2212), there are two Cu–O layers with a Ca layer in between. Similar to the Tl_{2}Ba_{2}CuO_{6} structure, Tl–O layers are present outside the Ba–O layers. In Tl_{2}Ba_{2}Ca_{2}Cu_{3}O_{10} (Tl-2223), there are three CuO2 layers enclosing Ca layers between each of these. In Tl-based superconductors, T_{c} is found to increase with the increase in CuO_{2} layers. However, the value of T_{c} decreases after four CuO_{2} layers in TlBa_{2}Ca_{n−1}Cu_{n}O_{2n+3}, and in the Tl_{2}Ba_{2}Ca_{n−1}Cu_{n}O_{2n+4} compound, it decreases after three CuO_{2} layers.

== See also ==
- Cuprate superconductors
- Bismuth strontium calcium copper oxide
- Yttrium barium copper oxide
- Lanthanum barium copper oxide
