= Lanthanum cuprate =

Identifiers
CAS Number	12053-92-8
3D model (JSmol)	Interactive image
PubChem CID	159645064
- InChI: InChI=1S/Cu.2La.4O/q+2;2*+3;4*-2 Key: VTQXYJGFVOFCDC-UHFFFAOYSA-N
- SMILES: [O-2].[O-2].[O-2].[O-2].[Cu+2].[La+3].[La+3]

Properties
Chemical formula	CuLa_{2}O_{4}
Molar mass	405.353 g·mol^{−1}
Appearance	solid
Density	7.05 g/cm^{3}
- Except where otherwise noted, data are given for materials in their standard state (at 25 °C [77 °F], 100 kPa). Infobox references

Lanthanum cuprate usually refers to the inorganic compound with the formula CuLa_{2}O_{4}. The name implies that the compound consists of a cuprate ([CuO_{n}]^{2n-}) salt of lanthanum (La^{3+}). In fact it is a highly covalent solid. It is prepared by high temperature reaction of lanthanum oxide and copper(II) oxide follow by annealing under oxygen.

The material adopts a tetragonal structure related to potassium tetrafluoronickelate (K_{2}NiF_{4}), which is orthorhombic. Replacement of some lanthanum by barium gives the quaternary phase CuLa_{1.85}Ba_{0.15}O_{4}, called lanthanum barium copper oxide. That doped material displays superconductivity at −243 °C (30.1 K), which at the time of its discovery was a high temperature. This discovery initiated research on cuprate superconductors and was the basis of a Nobel Prize in Physics to Georg Bednorz and K. Alex Müller.
