= Rare-earth barium copper oxide =

Chemical compounds known for exhibiting high temperature superconductivity

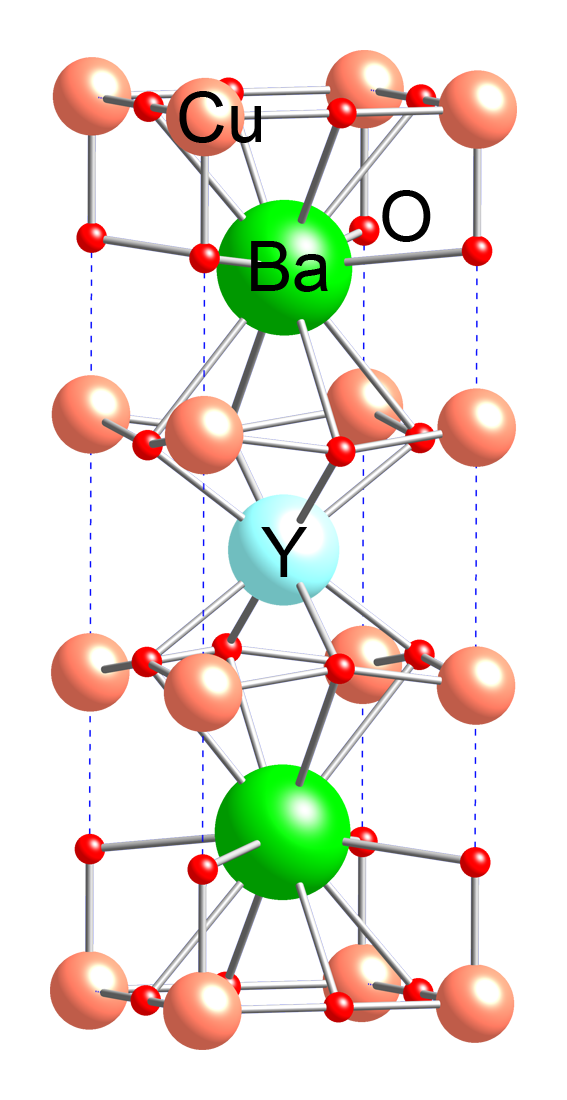
Unit cell of YBCO

Rare-earth barium copper oxide (ReBCO) is a family of chemical compounds known for exhibiting high-temperature superconductivity (HTS). ReBCO superconductors have the potential to sustain stronger magnetic fields than other superconductor materials. Due to their high critical temperature and critical magnetic field, this class of materials are proposed for use in technical applications where conventional low-temperature superconductors do not suffice. This includes magnetic confinement fusion reactors such as the ARC reactor, allowing a more compact and potentially more economical construction, and superconducting magnets to use in future particle accelerators to come after the Large Hadron Collider, which utilizes low-temperature superconductors.

== Materials ==
Any rare-earth element can be used in a ReBCO; popular choices include yttrium (YBCO), lanthanum (LBCO), samarium (Sm123), neodymium (Nd123 and Nd422), gadolinium (Gd123) and europium (Eu123), where the numbers among parenthesis indicate the molar ratio among rare-earth, barium and copper.

== YBCO ==
YBCO critical current (KA/cm^{2}) vs absolute temperature (K), at different magnetic field (T).

The most famous ReBCO is yttrium barium copper oxide, YBa_{2}Cu_{3}O_{7−x} (or Y123), the first superconductor found with a critical temperature above the boiling point of liquid nitrogen. Its molar ratio is 1 to 2 to 3 for yttrium, barium, and copper and it has a unit cell consisting of subunits, which is the typical structure of perovskites. In particular, the subunits are three, overlapping and containing an yttrium atom at the center of the middle one and a barium atom at the center of the others. Therefore, yttrium and barium are stacked according to the sequence [Ba-Y-Ba], along an axis conventionally denoted by c, (the vertical direction in the figure at the top right).

The resulting cell has an orthorhombic structure, unlike other superconducting cuprates that generally have a tetragonal structure. All the corner sites of the unit cell are occupied by copper, which has two different coordinates, Cu(1) and Cu(2), with respect to oxygen. It offers four possible crystallographic sites for oxygen: O(1), O(2), O(3), and O(4).

== History ==
Because these kind of materials are brittle it was difficult to create wires from them. After 2010, industrial manufacturers started to produce tapes, with different layers encapsulating the ReBCO material, opening the way to commercial uses.

In September 2021 Commonwealth Fusion Systems (CFS) created a test magnet with ReBCO tape that handled a current of 40,000 amperes, with a magnetic field of 20 tesla at 20 K. One important innovation was to avoid insulating the tape, saving space and lowering required voltages. Another was the size of the magnet: 10 tons, far larger than any prior experiment. The magnet assembly consisted of 16 plates, called pancakes, each hosting a spiral winding of tape on one side and cooling channels on the other.

In 2023, the National High Magnetic Field Laboratory generated 32 tesla with a ReBCO superconducting magnet. A 40T superconducting magnet is under construction.

In June 2024, the first plasma was achieved in the HH70 tokamak, developed by the China-based fusion energy company Energy Singularity. Using ReBCO as material for the superconductors enabled the company to reduce the size of the HH70 tokamak to two percent of conventional tokamaks.

== See also ==
- Cuprate superconductor
- List of superconductors
