= Paul Grant (physicist) =

Physicist, Science-Writer

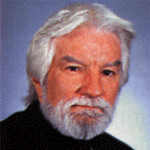
- Paul Grant
- Born: May 9, 1935; Poughkeepsie, New York, USA
- Died: December 20, 2023 (aged 88); Ajijic, Mexico
- Education: Clarkson University, Harvard University
- Occupations: Physicist, Science-Writer
- Employer(s): IBM, EPRI, W2AGZ
- Awards: Senior Fellow of the American Physical Society; Fellow of the Institute of Physics, United Kingdom; Distinguished Lecturer, American Physical Society; "Notable Knight, Clarkson University

Paul Michael Grant (May 9, 1935 – December 20, 2023) was an American/Irish physicist and science writer who was involved in discovering and elucidating the structure of yttrium barium copper oxide which was important as the first high temperature superconductor to exhibit superconductivity above the boiling point of nitrogen. He was a co-author of IBM's US patent application covering their preparation.

== Career ==
Grant joined IBM Poughkeepsie, NY in 1953 working as a technician on the SAGE computer defense system. He was able to take advantage of IBM's educational leave-of-absence program to obtain a BS degree from Clarkson and a Ph.D. from Harvard.

In 1957, he filed a patent that is cited as a precursor to the magnetoresistive head used universally in magnetic recording. In 1965, he moved to IBM Research – Almaden. At IBM, Grant was among the team researching superconductivity in the material Yttrium Barium Copper Oxide (YBCO) and found it to exhibit superconductivity at temperatures as high as 90 K. This patent application provided some of first evidence that superconductivity could be supported at temperatures above the boiling point of nitrogen, a common cryogenic refrigerant.

In 1987–88, with guidance from Grant, his 8th-grade daughter, Heidi, and then subsequently a science class at Gilroy High School, were able to show the relative ease with which high temperature superconductors could be fabricated and demonstrated.

Also in 1987, Grant became the manager of the group at IBM devoted to research on exotic new materials, including superconductors. When high-Tc cuprate superconductors were discovered at IBM Zurich that same year, Grant became the driving force behind the work at IBM Research - Almaden in this hot new area. IBM Almaden made many important discoveries related to these cuprate superconductors, with Grant involved on most of them.

From 1990 to 1993, Grant was a "visiting faculty researcher" at the Instituto de Investigationes Materiales (IIM), National Autonomous University of Mexico (UNAM), where he carried out numerical studies on the properties of rare earth copper oxides. From 1993 to 2004, he was a Science Fellow with the Electric Power Research Institute (EPRI).

In 2004, Grant started his own consulting business and became an assiduous advocate for commercial applications of superconductivity. He was a popular science writer and a prolific author of scientific papers and patents, and a member of the Storage Interest Group at the Computer History Museum. From 2005 to 2008, he was a visiting scholar in applied physics at Stanford University.

== Patent dispute ==
In 2000, a patent dispute over the invention of YBCO (see above) dating back to March 1987 was finally resolved. The dispute was between IBM's Almaden Research Center, the US Naval Research Laboratory, the University of Houston, and Bell Labs. Ultimately, Bell Labs. prevailed and was granted the US patent based on priority date (date of invention rather than the current criterion of date of filing).

== Recognition and awards ==
Grant became a Senior Fellow of the American Physical Society in 1998 "For contributions to the fields of organic conductors and high temperature superconductivity". He became a Fellow of the Institute of Physics, United Kingdom, in Nov 2004.

In 2013, Grant was chosen as American Physical Society Distinguished Lecturer on the Applications of Physics.

Grant was also one of Clarkson University's "Notable Knights".

== Science writing ==
Grant was a prolific science writer, for both professional and popular audiences. He wrote multiple articles and News and Views commentaries on a range of topics for the journal Nature.

== Final years ==
In 2021, Grant retired to Ajijic, Mexico with his wife Maru Grant. He died on December 20, 2023.
