= HH70 =

Fusion reactor

Honghuang 70
- Device type: Tokamak
- Location: China
- Affiliation: Energy Singularity

Technical specifications
- Major radius: 0.75 m
- Minor radius: 0.31 m
- Magnetic field: 0.6 T

History
- Year(s) of operation: 2024–present

HH70
- Chinese: 洪荒70
- Hanyu Pinyin: hónghuāng 70
- Literal meaning: Primeval Chaos 70
Transcriptions
Standard Mandarin
- Hanyu Pinyin: hónghuāng 70

HH70 is a tokamak developed by the Chinese fusion power company Energy Singularity. It has been in operation since June 2024. The reactor is notable as the first tokamak to employ high-temperature superconductors exclusively for its magnet system.

== History ==
Energy Singularity formed in June 2021. The design work on HH70 (Hóng Huāng or 'primal chaos') began in March 2022. HH70 was designed to be smaller and more cost-effective than conventional tokamaks by using high-temperature superconductors. The company completed construction in February 2024 and achieved first plasma in June 2024. The company said that the cost was $16M. Alex Kimani has cited the completion of HH70 before ITER and SPARC as evidence of a first-mover advantage for China.

Energy Singularity is working on the successor reactor, HH170, targeting a fusion energy gain factor (Q) greater than 10 by 2027 at a forecast cost of $420M.

== Technology ==
Unlike earlier tokamak efforts such as the Joint European Torus or ITER, HH70's magnet system is built entirely with high-temperature superconductors. The choice of ReBCO significantly reduces the reactor's required volume. The number 70 reflects the major radius. A similar approach is under way at Commonwealth Fusion Systems, building SPARC. In late 2024, HH70 created a toroidal magnetic field exceeding 1 tesla.

== See also ==
- SPARC
- List of fusion experiments
