= Mark Beno =

- Born: 1951
- Died: August 24, 2019 (aged 67–68)
- Known for: work on YBa_{2}Cu_{3}O_{7}
- Children: 1

Mark Beno (1951 – August 24, 2019) was a Senior Chemist at the Argonne National Laboratory best known for his work in chemical crystallography. He was the first to determine the crystal structure of the high temperature superconductor, YBa_{2}Cu_{3}O_{7}, and his research continues to help researchers understand the types and structures that are likely to form this class. Beno was posthumously awarded the distinction of Fellow by the American Association for the Advancement of Science (AAAS).

== Biography ==
=== Personal life ===
Mark married Mary Beno and has a son. He is also survived by his father (Donald), his brother (Henry) and his sister (Donna).

=== Education ===
Mark Beno received his B.S. in chemistry and mathematics from Marquette University in 1973 and a Ph.D in physical chemistry from Ohio State University in 1979.

=== Work ===
Mark Beno was a Senior Chemist at the US Department of Energy's (DOE) Argonne national Laboratory, joining the company in 1982.

His early work was focused on solving the crystal structures of superconductors, which are materials that conduct electricity with no resistance. He was the first to person to determine the crystal structure of the high temperature superconductor, YBa_{2}Cu_{3}O_{7}, and published his results in a paper in 1989.

After this, Beno became a member of the Synchrotron Radiation Science group in the Materials Science Division where he was in charge of the design, construction, and operations of the Basic Energy Sciences Synchrotron Radiation Center (BESSRC) beamlines at Sectors 11 and 12 of the Advanced Photon Source (APS), a DOE Office of Science User Facility.

In the mid-90s when APS was moving from construction to operations he was asked to help develop the scientific programs coming online. Beno was appointed the BESSRC group leader and moved with his group of colleagues to what is now the X-ray Science Division (XSD) in 2003. In 2005 he was named the deputy director for XSD, and has twice served as its interim division director.

Beno's research has produced more than 190 publications which resulted in three awards from the DOE Basic Energy Sciences, Division of Materials Sciences, for Outstanding Scientific Accomplishment.

== Honours & awards ==
In 2019 Mark Beno was posthumously awarded the distinction of Fellow by the American Association for the Advancement of Science (AAAS) for his expertise in chemical crystallography. He was the only Argonne scientist awarded this honour in 2019.

The AAAS honour recognizes diverse accomplishments, including pioneering research, leadership, teaching and mentoring, fostering collaborations and advancing public understanding of science. To be considered for the rank of Fellow, an AAAS member has to be nominated by three previously elected fellows, the steering group of an AAAS section, or the organization's CEO.
