= Superconducting wire =

Wires exhibiting zero resistance

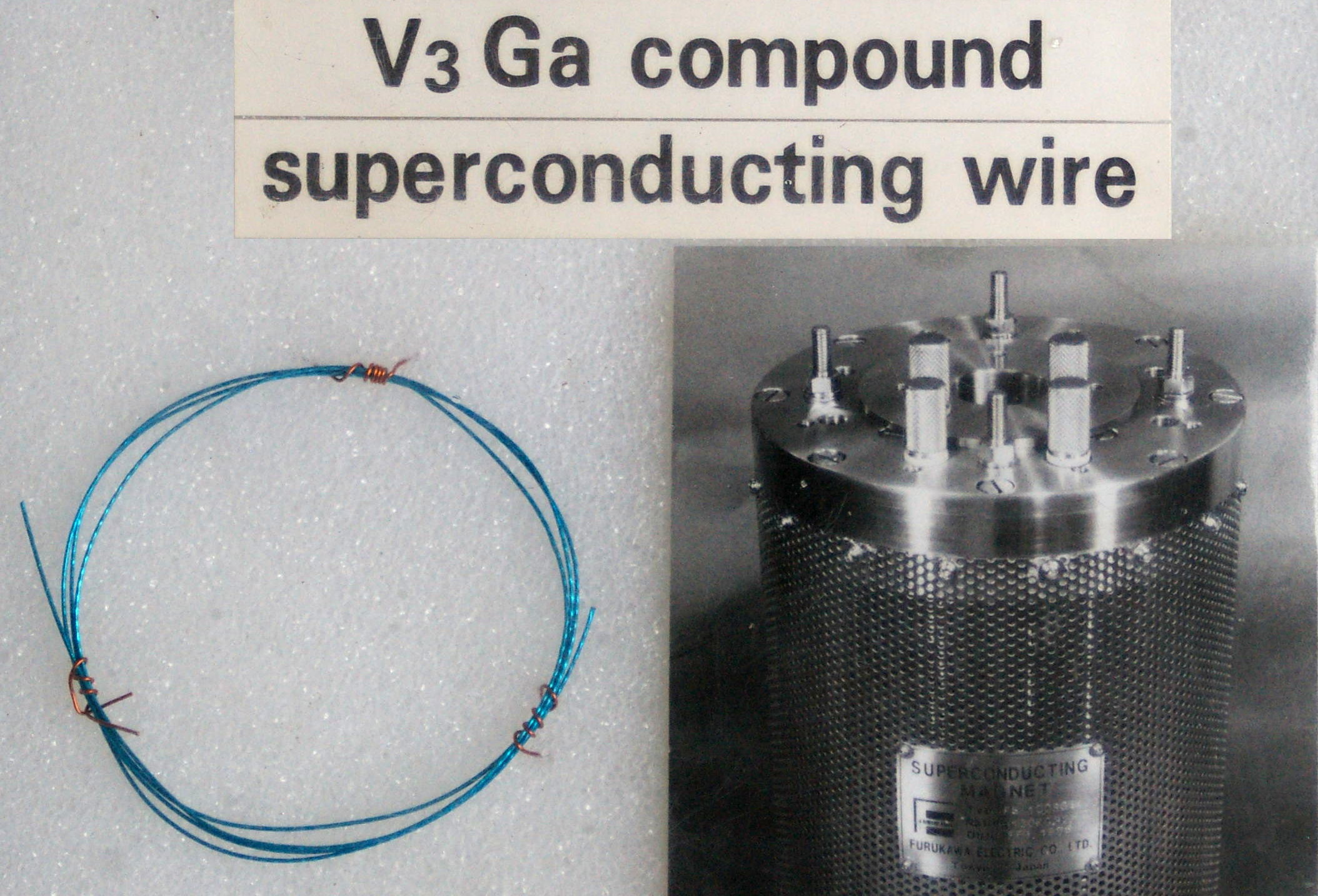
An example of a wire (V_{3}Ga alloy) used in a superconducting magnet

Superconducting wires are electrical wires made of superconductive material. When cooled below their transition temperatures, they have zero electrical resistance. Most commonly, conventional superconductors such as niobium–titanium are used, but high-temperature superconductors such as YBCO are entering the market.

Superconducting wire's advantages over copper or aluminum include higher maximum current densities and zero power dissipation. Its disadvantages include the cost of refrigeration of the wires to superconducting temperatures (often requiring cryogens such as liquid nitrogen or liquid helium), the danger of the wire quenching (a sudden loss of superconductivity), the inferior mechanical properties of some superconductors, and the cost of wire materials and construction.

Its main application is in superconducting magnets, which are used in scientific and medical equipment where high magnetic fields are necessary.

== Important parameters ==
The construction and operating temperature will typically be chosen to maximise:

- Critical temperature T_{c}, the temperature below which the wire becomes a superconductor
- Critical current density J_{c}, the maximum current a superconducting wire can carry per unit cross-sectional area (see images below for examples with 20 kA/cm^{2}).

Superconducting wires/tapes/cables usually consist of two key features:

- The superconducting compound (usually in the form of filaments/coating)
- A conduction stabilizer, which carries the current in case of the loss of superconductivity (known as quenching) in the superconducting material.

The current sharing temperature T_{cs} is the temperature at which the current transported through the superconductor also starts to flow through the stabilizer. However, T_{cs} is not the same as the quench temperature (or critical temperature) T_{c}; in the former case, there is partial loss of superconductivity, while in the latter case, the superconductivity is entirely lost.

== LTS wire ==
Low-temperature superconductor (LTS) wires are made from superconductors with low critical temperature, such as Nb_{3}Sn (niobium–tin) and NbTi (niobium–titanium). Often the superconductor is in filament form in a copper or aluminium matrix which carries the current should the superconductor quench for any reason. The superconductor filaments can form a third of the total volume of the wire.

== Preparation ==
=== Wire drawing ===
The normal wire-drawing process can be used for malleable alloys such as niobium–titanium.

=== Surface diffusion ===
Vanadium–gallium (V_{3}Ga) can be prepared by surface diffusion where the high temperature component as a solid is bathed in the other element as liquid or gas. When all components remain in the solid state during high temperature diffusion this is known as the bronze process.

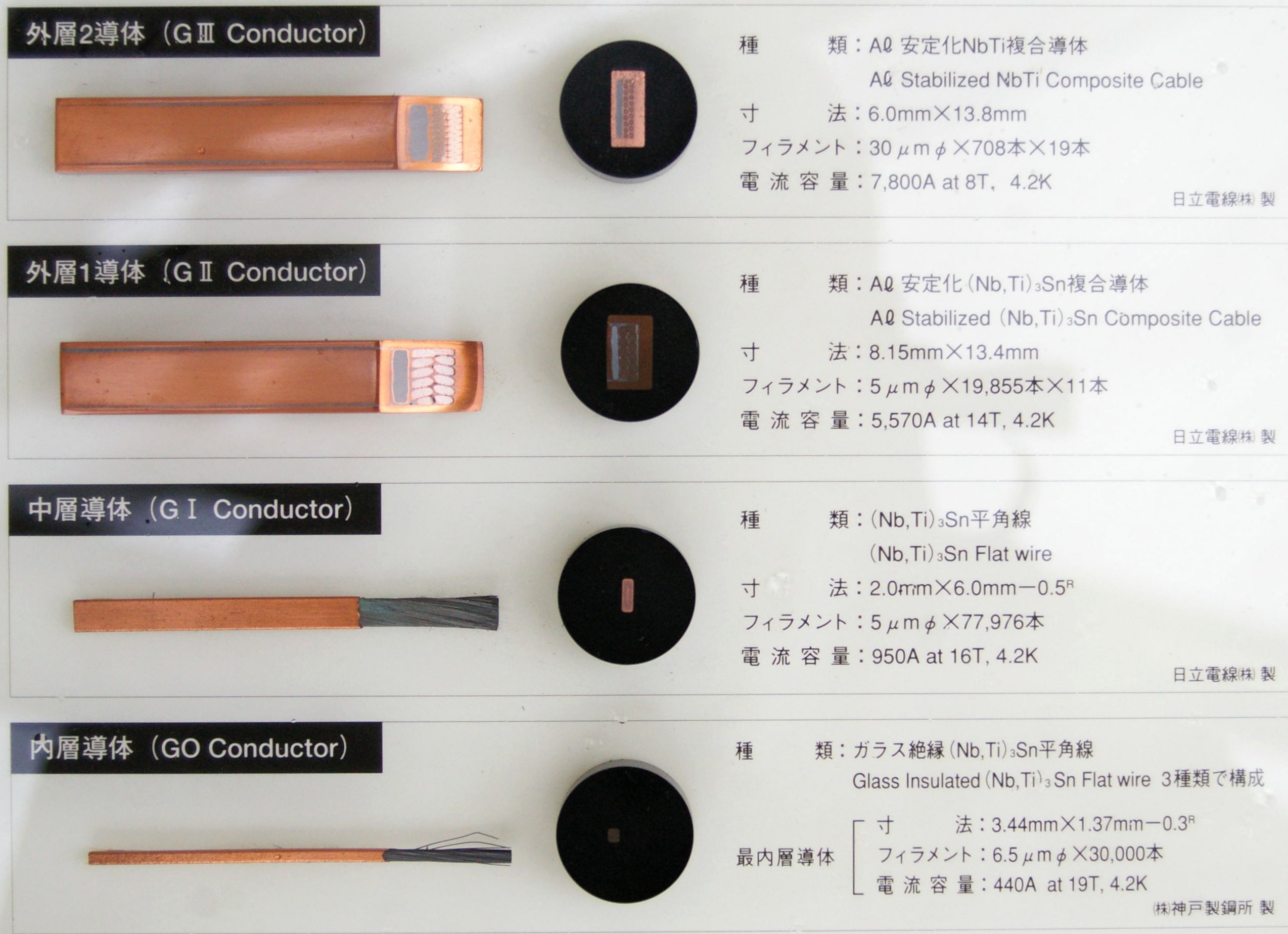
Cross sections of various (Nb,Ti)_{3}Sn composite superconducting cables and wires. (440 to 7,800 A in 8 to 19 tesla fields).

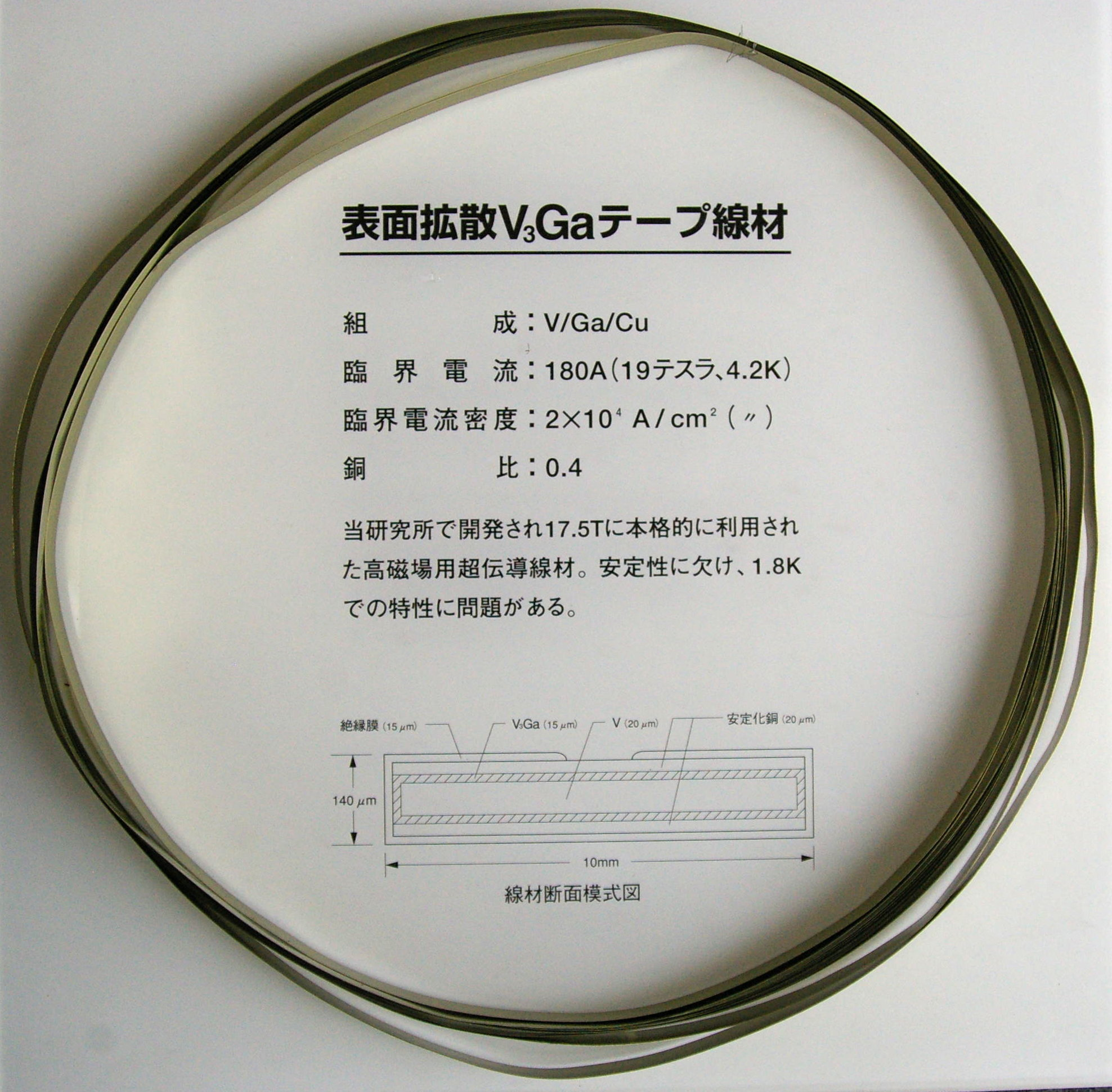
V_{3}Ga superconducting tape (10×0.14 mm cross section). A vanadium core is covered with 15 μm V_{3}Ga layer, then 20 μm bronze (stabilizing layer) and 15 μm insulating layer. Critical current 180 A (19.2 tesla, 4.2 K), critical current density 20 kA/cm^{2}

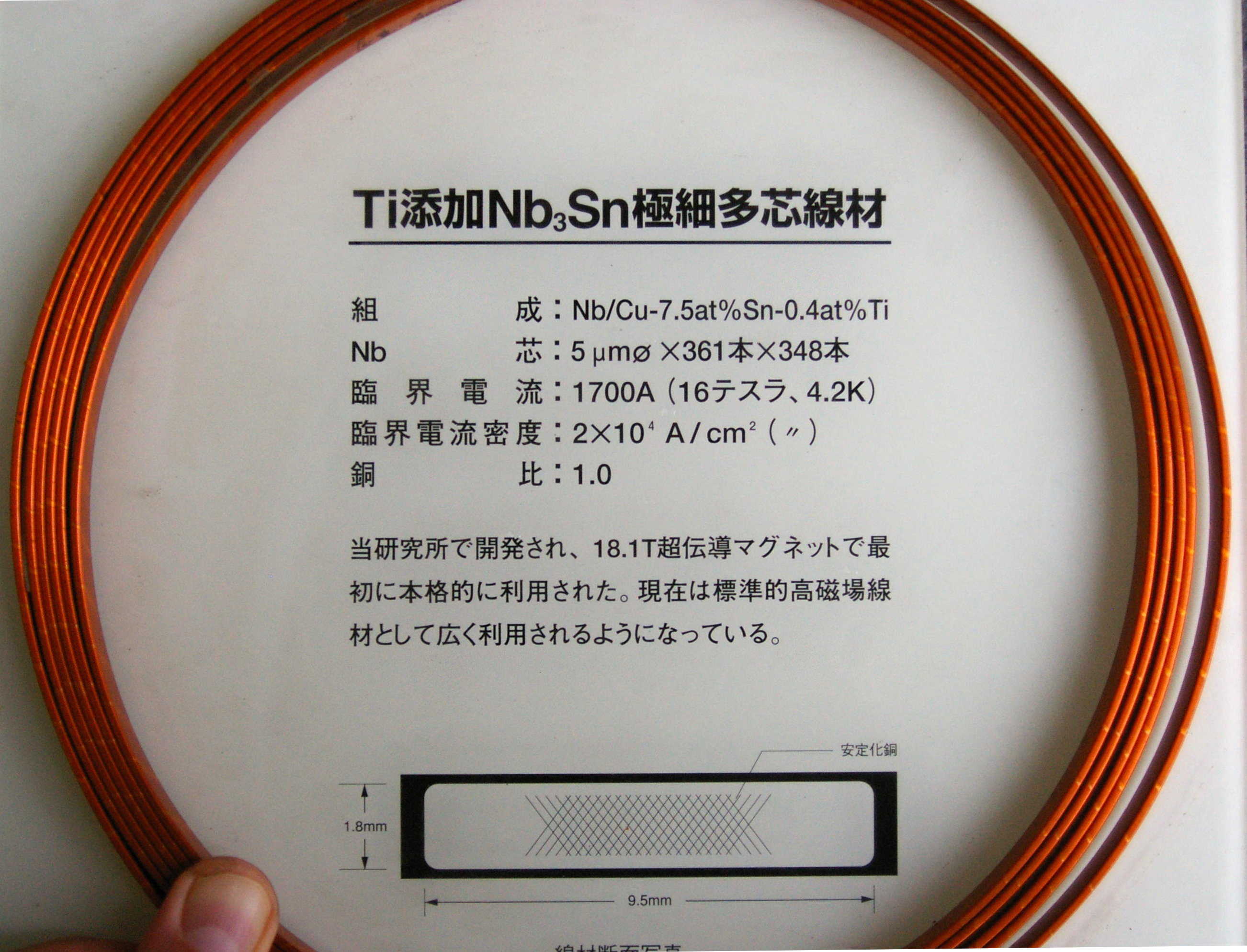
Nb/Cu–7.5at%Sn–0.4at%Ti tape (9.5×1.8 mm cross section) originally developed for an 18.1 T magnet. Nb core: 361×348 packs of 5 μm dia. filaments. Critical current 1700 A (16 tesla, 4.2 K), critical current density 20 kA/cm^{2}

== HTS wire ==
High-temperature superconductor (HTS) wires are made from superconductors with high critical temperature (high-temperature superconductivity), such as YBCO and BSCCO.

=== Powder-in-tube ===
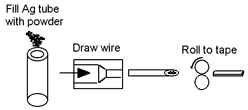
Simplified diagram of the PIT process

The powder-in-tube (PIT, or oxide powder in tube, OPIT) process is an extrusion process often used for making electrical conductors from brittle superconducting materials such as niobium–tin or magnesium diboride, and ceramic cuprate superconductors such as BSCCO. It has been used to form wires of the iron pnictides. (PIT is not used for yttrium barium copper oxide as it does not have the weak layers required to generate adequate 'texture' (alignment) in the PIT process.)

This process is used because the high-temperature superconductors are too brittle for normal wire forming processes. The tubes are metal, often silver. Often the tubes are heated to react the mix of powders. Once reacted the tubes are sometimes flattened to form a tape-like conductor. The resulting wire is not as flexible as conventional metal wire, but is sufficient for many applications.

There are in situ and ex situ variants of the process, as well a 'double core' method that combines both.

=== Coated superconductor tape or wire ===
These wires are in a form of a metal tape of about 10 mm width and about 100 micrometer thickness, coated with superconductor materials such as YBCO. A few years after the discovery of High-temperature superconductivity materials such as the YBCO, it was demonstrated that epitaxial YBCO thin films grown on lattice matched single crystals such as magnesium oxide MgO, strontium titanate (SrTiO_{3}) and sapphire had high supercritical current densities of 10–40 kA/mm^{2}. However, a lattice-matched flexible material was needed for producing a long tape. YBCO films deposited directly on metal substrate materials exhibit poor superconducting properties. It was demonstrated that a c-axis oriented yttria-stabilized zirconia (YSZ) intermediate layer on a metal substrate can yield YBCO films of higher quality, which had still one to two orders less critical current density than that produced on the single crystal substrates.

The breakthrough came with the invention of ion beam-assisted deposition (IBAD) technique to produce of biaxially aligned yttria-stabilized zirconia (YSZ) thin films on metal tapes and the Rolling-Assisted-Biaxially-Textured-Substrates (RABiTS) process to produce biaxially textured metallic substrates via thermomechanically processing.

In the IBAD process, the biaxially-textured YSZ film provided a single-crystal-like template for the epitaxial growth of the YBCO films. These YBCO films achieved critical current density of more than 1 MA/cm^{2}. Other buffer layers such as cerium oxide (CeO_{2}) and magnesium oxide (MgO) were produced using the IBAD technique for the superconductor films. Details of the IBAD substrates and technology were reviewed by Arendt. The process of LMO-enabled IBAD–MgO was invented and developed at the Oak Ridge National Laboratory and won a R&D100 Award in 2007. This LMO-enabled substrate process is now being used by essentially all manufacturers of HST wire based on the IBAD substrate. In the RABiTS substrates, the metallic template itself was biaxially-textured and heteroepitaxial buffer layers of Y_{2}O_{3}, YSZ and CeO_{2} were then deposited on the metallic template, followed by heterepitaxial deposition of the superconductor layer. Details of the RABiTS substrates and technology were reviewed by Goyal.

As of 2015, YBCO coated superconductor tapes capable of carrying more than 500 A/cm-width at 77 K and 1000 A/cm-width at 30 K under high magnetic field have been demonstrated. In 2021 YBCO coated superconductor tapes capable of carrying more than 250 A/cm-width at 77 K and 2500 A/cm-width at 20 K were reported for commercially produced wires. In 2021 an experimental demonstration of an over-doped YBCO film reported 90 MA/cm^{2} at 5 K and 6 MA/cm^{2} at 77 K in a 7 T magnetic field.

=== Metal organic chemical vapor deposition ===
Metal organic chemical vapor deposition (MOCVD) is one of the deposition processes used for fabrication of YBCO coated conductor tapes. Ignatiev provides an overview of MOCVD processes used to deposit YBCO films via MOCVD deposition.

=== Reactive co-evaporation ===
Superconducting layer in the 2nd generation superconducting wires can also be grown by thermal evaporation of constituent metals, rare-earth element, barium, and copper. Prusseit provides an overview of the thermal evaporation process used to deposit high-quality YBCO films.

=== Pulsed laser deposition ===
Superconducting layer in the 2nd generation superconducting wires can also be grown by pulsed laser deposition (PLD). Christen provides an overview of the PLD process used to deposit high-quality YBCO films.

== Standards ==
There are several IEC (International Electrotechnical Commission) standards related to superconducting wires under TC90.

== See also ==
- Copper-clad aluminium wire
- Graphene-clad wire
- Skin effect
- Residual-resistivity ratio
