= SPARC (tokamak) =

Experimental fusion reactor

Coordinates: 42.5437°N 71.6271°W

Soonest/Smallest Possible ARC
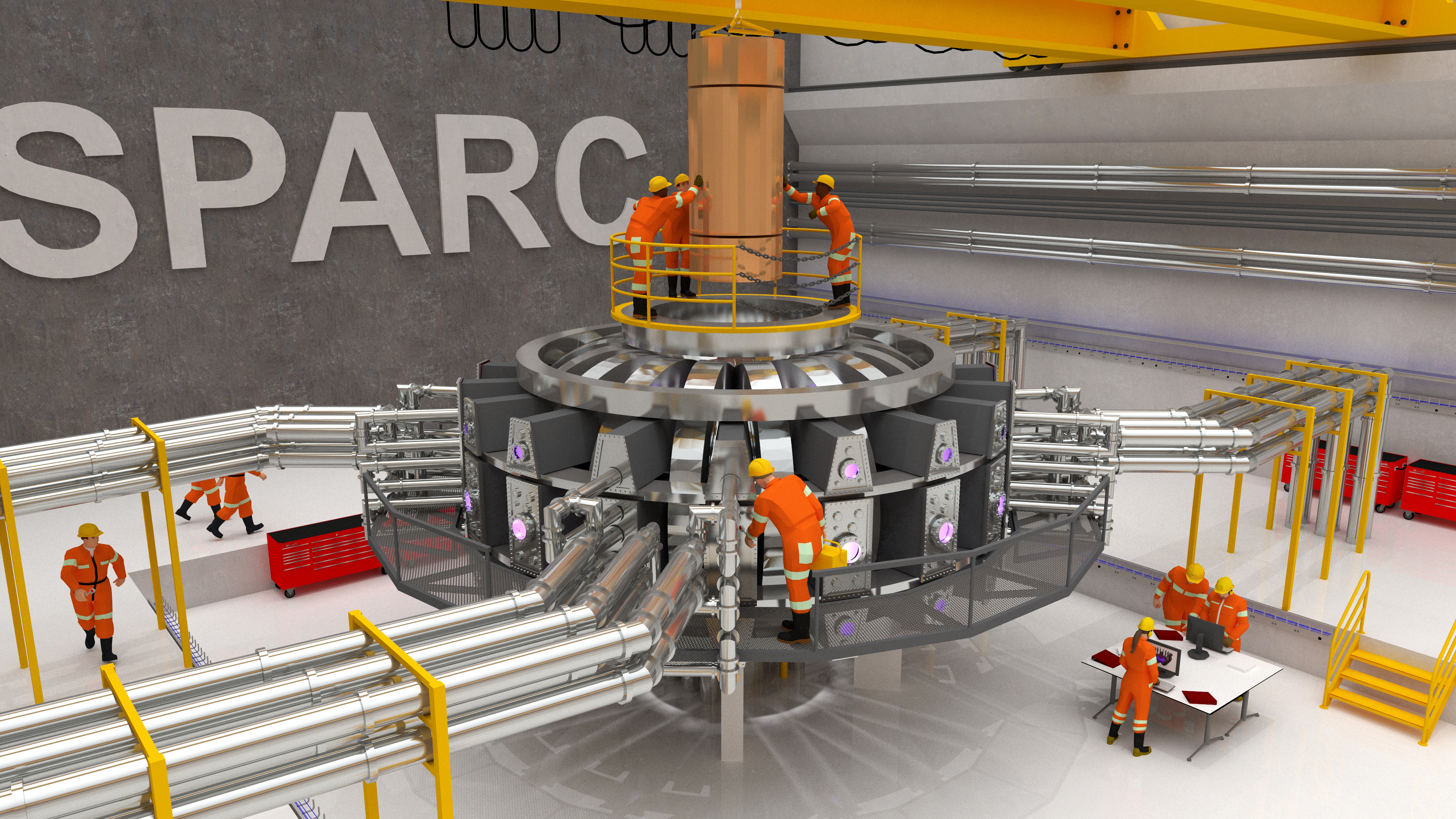
- Device type: Tokamak
- Location: Devens, Massachusetts, United States
- Affiliation: Commonwealth Fusion Systems; MIT Plasma Science and Fusion Center

Technical specifications
- Major radius: 1.85 m
- Minor radius: 0.57 m
- Plasma volume: 20 m^{3}
- Magnetic field: 12.2 T
- Heating power: 25 MW
- Fusion power: (140 MW)
- Discharge duration: (10 s)
- Plasma current: (8.7 MA)
- Plasma temperature: (80×10^{6} K)

History
- Date(s) of construction: 2021–present
- Year(s) of operation: 2027 (projected; first plasma)

SPARC is a tokamak under development by Commonwealth Fusion Systems (CFS) in collaboration with the Massachusetts Institute of Technology Plasma Science and Fusion Center. Funding has come from Eni, Breakthrough Energy Ventures, Khosla Ventures, Temasek, Equinor, Devonshire Investors, and others.

Through SPARC, CFS plans to verify the technology and physics required to build a power plant based on the ARC fusion power plant concept. SPARC is designed to achieve this with margin in excess of scientific breakeven (fusion energy gain factor Q > 1) and may be capable of achieving up to 140 MW of fusion power for 10-second bursts despite its relatively compact size.

The project is scheduled to start operations in 2026, with the goal of demonstrating first plasma in 2027 and scientific breakeven (Q > 1) shortly after that. It was initially scheduled for operation in 2025 after completing a magnet test in 2021.

== History ==
The SPARC project was announced in 2018 with a planned completion in 2025. The name was chosen as an abbreviation of "Smallest Possible ARC", where ARC stands for "affordable, robust, compact". In March 2021, CFS announced that it planned to build SPARC at its campus in Devens, Massachusetts.

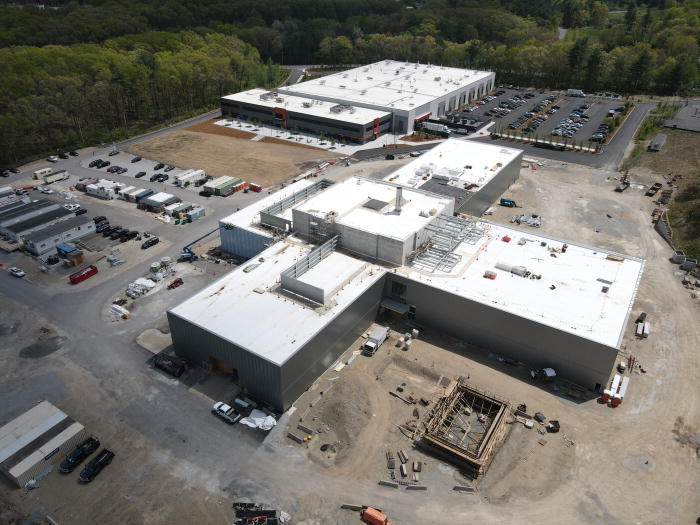
Construction site in May 2023

In September 2021, the project successfully tested a prototype toroidal high-field coil, achieving a record for high-temperature superconducting magnets, with a field strength of 20 T at the temperature of 20 K.

In November 2024, a prototype of the reactor's central solenoid was demonstrated, and the building housing SPARC in Devens was largely completed, with assembly of the SPARC tokamak in early stages.

In January 2026, the first of 18 toroidal field magnets was completed and placed on an assembly jig in the building housing SPARC.

== Technology ==
SPARC uses yttrium barium copper oxide (YBCO) high-temperature superconducting magnets that retain superconductivity at temperatures as high as 77 K (optimally at 10 K). The resulting plasmas are expected to generate at least twice as much energy as is required to sustain themselves at high temperatures (200 million K), giving a fusion gain Q > 2, with an expected Q ≈ 11.

== See also ==
- ARC fusion reactor
- ITER
- HH70
