= Highly oriented pyrolytic graphite =

Highly pure and ordered form of synthetic graphite

Highly oriented pyrolytic graphite (HOPG) is a highly pure and ordered form of synthetic graphite. It is characterised by a low mosaic spread angle, meaning that the individual graphite crystallites are well aligned with each other. The best HOPG samples have mosaic spreads of less than 1 degree.

Note that the term "highly ordered pyrolytic graphite" is sometimes used for this material, but IUPAC favors "highly oriented".

== Synthesis ==
The method used to produce HOPG is based on the process used to make pyrolytic graphite, but with additional tensile stress in the basal-plane direction. This produces improved alignment of the graphite crystallites and an interplanar spacing close to that observed in natural graphite. The "stress recrystallization" of graphite was first described by L. C. F. Blackman and Alfred Ubbelohde in 1962.

The diameters of the individual crystallites in HOPG are typically in the range 1–10 μm.

== Application ==
HOPG is used in x-ray optics as a monochromator and in scanning probe microscopy as a substrate and for magnification calibration.
