= Cuprate superconductor =

Type of high-temperature superconductor

Cuprate superconductors are a family of high-temperature superconducting materials made of layers of copper oxides (CuO_{2}) alternating with layers of other metal oxides, which act as charge reservoirs. At ambient pressure, cuprate superconductors are the highest temperature superconductors known.

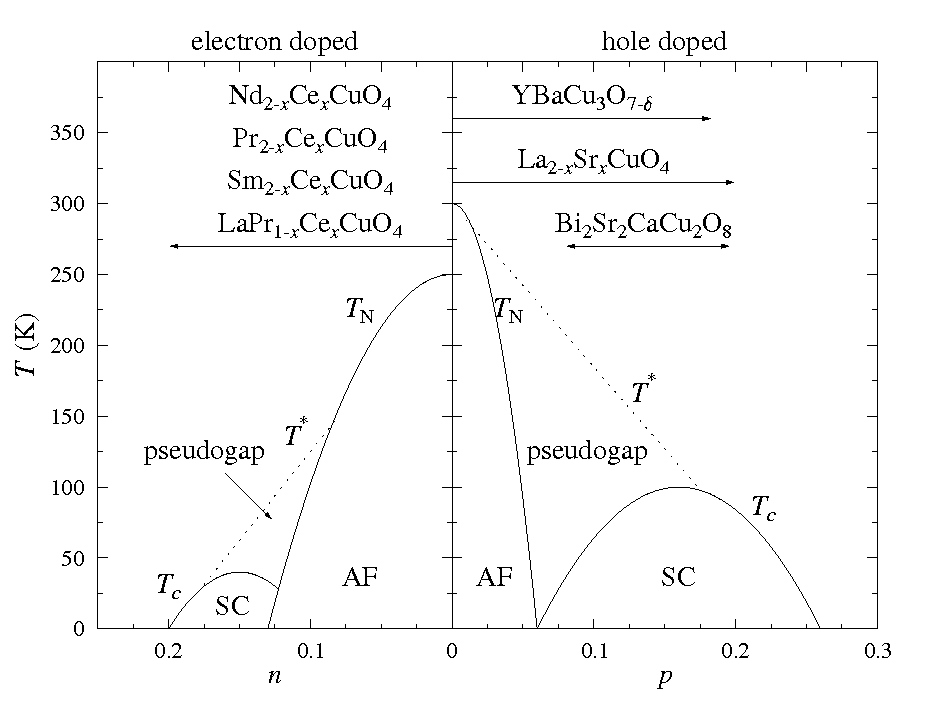
Phase diagram of cuprate superconductors: They can be basically split into electron (n) and hole (p) doped cuprates, as for the basic models describing semiconductors. Both standard cuprate superconductors, YBCO and BSCCO, are notably hole-doped.

Cuprates have a structure close to that of a two-dimensional material. Their superconducting properties are determined by electrons moving within weakly coupled copper-oxide (CuO_{2}) layers. Neighbouring layers contain ions such as lanthanum, barium, strontium, or other atoms that act to stabilize the structures and dope electrons or holes onto the copper-oxide layers. The undoped "parent" or "mother" compounds are Mott insulators with long-range antiferromagnetic order at sufficiently low temperatures. Single band models are generally considered to be enough to describe the electronic properties.

The cuprate superconductors adopt a perovskite structure. The copper-oxide planes are checkerboard lattices with squares of O^{2−} ions with a Cu^{2+} ion at the centre of each square. The unit cell is rotated by 45° from these squares. Chemical formulae of superconducting materials contain fractional numbers to describe the doping required for superconductivity.

Several families of cuprate superconductors have been identified. They can be categorized by their elements and the number of adjacent copper-oxide layers in each superconducting block. For example, YBCO and BSCCO can be referred to as Y123 and Bi2201/Bi2212/Bi2223 depending on the number of layers in each superconducting block (n). The superconducting transition temperature peaks at an optimal doping value (p=0.16) and an optimal number of layers in each block, typically three.

Possible mechanisms for cuprate superconductivity remain the subject of considerable debate and research. Similarities between the low-temperature state of undoped materials and the superconducting state that emerges upon doping, primarily the d_{x^{2}−y^{2}} orbital state of the Cu^{2+} ions, suggest that electron–electron interactions are more significant than electron–phonon interactions in cuprates – making the superconductivity unconventional. Recent work on the Fermi surface has shown that nesting occurs at four points in the antiferromagnetic Brillouin zone where spin waves exist and that the superconducting energy gap is larger at these points. The weak isotope effects observed for most cuprates contrast with conventional superconductors that are well described by BCS theory.

== Types ==
=== Yttrium–barium cuprate ===
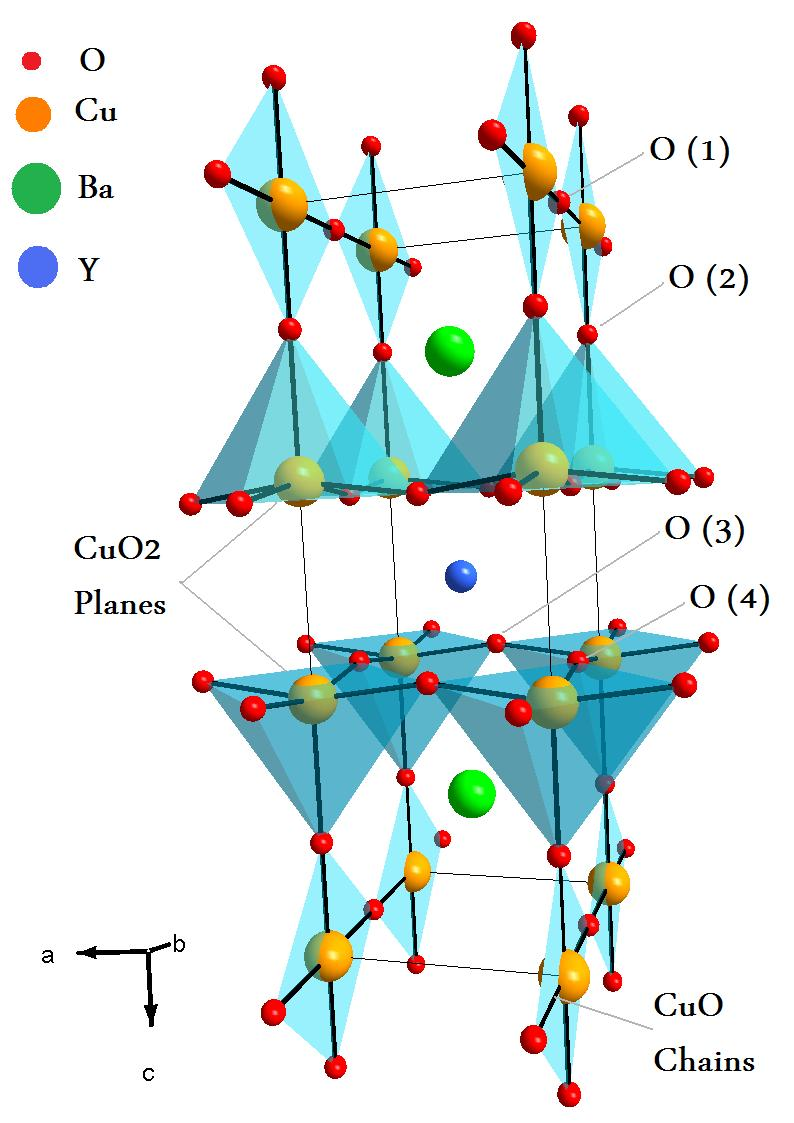
Unit cell for the Cuprate of Barium and Yttrium (YBCO)

An yttrium–barium cuprate, YBa_{2}Cu_{3}O_{7−x} (or Y123), was the first superconductor found above liquid nitrogen boiling point. The three different metals in the YBa_{2}Cu_{3}O_{7} superconductor are in the mole ratio of 1 to 2 to 3 for yttrium to barium to copper, respectively; hence, this particular superconductor has often been referred to as the 123 superconductor.

The unit cell of YBa_{2}Cu_{3}O_{7} consists of three perovskite unit cells, which is pseudocubic, nearly orthorhombic. The other superconducting cuprates have another structure: they have a tetragonal cell. Each perovskite cell contains a Y or Ba atom at the center: Ba in the bottom unit cell, Y in the middle one, and Ba in the top unit cell. Thus, Y and Ba are stacked in the sequence [Ba–Y–Ba] along the c-axis. All corner sites of the unit cell are occupied by Cu, which has two different coordinations, Cu(1) and Cu(2), with respect to oxygen. There are four possible crystallographic sites for oxygen: O(1), O(2), O(3) and O(4). The coordination polyhedra of Y and Ba with respect to oxygen are different. The tripling of the perovskite unit cell leads to nine oxygen atoms, whereas YBa_{2}Cu_{3}O_{7} has seven oxygen atoms and, therefore, is referred to as an oxygen-deficient perovskite structure. The structure has a stacking of different layers: (CuO)(BaO)(CuO_{2})(Y)(CuO_{2})(BaO)(CuO). One of the key feature of the unit cell of YBa_{2}Cu_{3}O_{7−x} (YBCO) is the presence of two layers of CuO_{2}. The role of the Y plane is to serve as a spacer between two CuO_{2} planes. In YBCO, the Cu–O chains are known to play an important role for superconductivity. T_{c} is maximal near 92 K (−181.2 °C) when x ≈ 0.15 and the structure is orthorhombic. Superconductivity disappears at x ≈ 0.6, where the structural transformation of YBCO occurs from orthorhombic to tetragonal.

=== Other cuprates ===
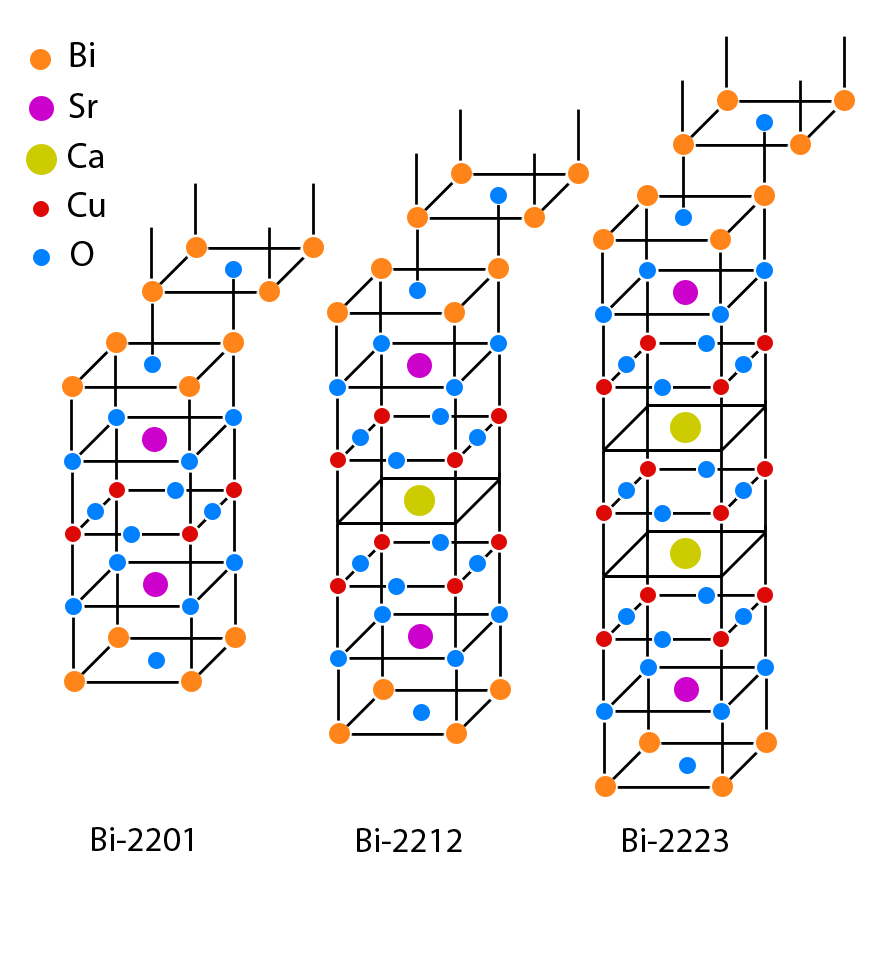
Crystal lattice of Cuprate of Bismuth and Strontium (BSCCO)

The preparation of other cuprates is more difficult than the YBCO preparation. They also have a different crystal structure: they are tetragonal where YBCO is orthorhombic. Problems in these superconductors arise because of the existence of three or more phases having a similar layered structure. Moreover, the crystal structure of other tested cuprate superconductors are very similar. Like YBCO, the perovskite-type feature and the presence of simple copper oxide (CuO_{2}) layers also exist in these superconductors. However, unlike YBCO, Cu–O chains are not present in these superconductors. The YBCO superconductor has an orthorhombic structure, whereas the other high-T_{c} superconductors have a tetragonal structure.

There are three main classes of superconducting cuprates: bismuth-based, thallium-based and mercury-based.

The second cuprate by practical importance is currently BSCCO, a compound of Bi–Sr–Ca–Cu–O. The content of bismuth and strontium creates some chemical issues. It has three superconducting phases forming a homologous series as Bi_{2}Sr_{2}Ca_{n−1}Cu_{n}O_{4+2n+x} (n=1, 2 and 3). These three phases are Bi-2201, Bi-2212 and Bi-2223, having transition temperatures of 20 K (−253.2 °C), 85 K (−188.2 °C) and 110 K (−163 °C), respectively, where the numbering system represent number of atoms for Bi Sr, Ca and Cu respectively. The two phases have a tetragonal structure which consists of two sheared crystallographic unit cells. The unit cell of these phases has double Bi–O planes which are stacked in a way that the Bi atom of one plane sits below the oxygen atom of the next consecutive plane. The Ca atom forms a layer within the interior of the CuO_{2} layers in both Bi-2212 and Bi-2223; there is no Ca layer in the Bi-2201 phase. The three phases differ with each other in the number of cuprate planes; Bi-2201, Bi-2212 and Bi-2223 phases have one, two and three CuO_{2} planes, respectively. The c axis lattice constants of these phases increases with the number of cuprate planes (see table below). The coordination of the Cu atom is different in the three phases. The Cu atom forms an octahedral coordination with respect to oxygen atoms in the 2201 phase, whereas in 2212, the Cu atom is surrounded by five oxygen atoms in a pyramidal arrangement. In the 2223 structure, Cu has two coordinations with respect to oxygen: one Cu atom is bonded with four oxygen atoms in square planar configuration and another Cu atom is coordinated with five oxygen atoms in a pyramidal arrangement.

Cuprate of Tl–Ba–Ca
The first series of the Tl-based superconductor containing one Tl–O layer has the general formula TlBa_{2}Ca_{n−1}Cu_{n}O_{2n+3}, whereas the second series containing two Tl–O layers has a formula of Tl_{2}Ba_{2}Ca_{n−1}Cu_{n}O_{2n+4} with n =1, 2 and 3. In the structure of Tl_{2}Ba_{2}CuO_{6} (Tl-2201), there is one CuO_{2} layer with the stacking sequence (Tl–O) (Tl–O) (Ba–O) (Cu–O) (Ba–O) (Tl–O) (Tl–O). In Tl_{2}Ba_{2}CaCu_{2}O_{8} (Tl-2212), there are two Cu–O layers with a Ca layer in between. Similar to the Tl_{2}Ba_{2}CuO_{6} structure, Tl–O layers are present outside the Ba–O layers. In Tl_{2}Ba_{2}Ca_{2}Cu_{3}O_{10} (Tl-2223), there are three CuO2 layers enclosing Ca layers between each of these. In Tl-based superconductors, T_{c} is found to increase with the increase in CuO_{2} layers. However, the value of T_{c} decreases after four CuO_{2} layers in TlBa_{2}Ca_{n−1}Cu_{n}O_{2n+3}, and in the Tl_{2}Ba_{2}Ca_{n−1}Cu_{n}O_{2n+4} compound, it decreases after three CuO_{2} layers.
Cuprate of Hg–Ba–Ca
The crystal structure of HgBa_{2}CuO_{4} (Hg-1201), HgBa_{2}CaCu_{2}O_{6} (Hg-1212) and HgBa_{2}Ca_{2}Cu_{3}O_{8} (Hg-1223) is similar to that of Tl-1201, Tl-1212 and Tl-1223, with Hg in place of Tl. It is noteworthy that the T_{c} of the Hg compound (Hg-1201) containing one CuO_{2} layer is much larger as compared to the one-CuO_{2}-layer compound of thallium (Tl-1201). In the Hg-based superconductor, T_{c} is also found to increase as the CuO_{2} layer increases. For Hg-1201, Hg-1212 and Hg-1223, the values of T_{c} are 94, 128, and the record value at ambient pressure 134 K (−139 °C), respectively, as shown in table below. The observation that the T_{c} of Hg-1223 increases to 153 K (−120 °C) under high pressure indicates that the T_{c} of this compound is very sensitive to the structure of the compound.

Superconducting temperature, crystal structure and lattice constants of some cuprate superconductors
Name	Formula	Temperature (K)	Number of planes of CuO_{2} in unit cell	Crystal structure
Y-123	YBa_{2}Cu_{3}O_{7}	92	2	Orthorhombic
Bi-2201	Bi_{2}Sr_{2}CuO_{6}	20	1	Tetragonal
Bi-2212	Bi_{2}Sr_{2}CaCu_{2}O_{8}	85	2	Tetragonal
Bi-2223	Bi_{2}Sr_{2}Ca_{2}Cu_{3}O_{10}	110	3	Tetragonal
Tl-2201	Tl_{2}Ba_{2}CuO_{6}	80	1	Tetragonal
Tl-2212	Tl_{2}Ba_{2}CaCu_{2}O_{8}	108	2	Tetragonal
Tl-2223	Tl_{2}Ba_{2}Ca_{2}Cu_{3}O_{10}	125	3	Tetragonal
Tl-1234	TlBa_{2}Ca_{3}Cu_{4}O_{11}	122	4	Tetragonal
Hg-1201	HgBa_{2}CuO_{4}	94	1	Tetragonal
Hg-1212	HgBa_{2}CaCu_{2}O_{6}	128	2	Tetragonal
Hg-1223	HgBa_{2}Ca_{2}Cu_{3}O_{8}	134	3	Tetragonal

== Preparation and manufacturing ==
The simplest method for preparing ceramic superconductors is a solid-state thermochemical reaction involving mixing, calcination and sintering. The appropriate amounts of precursor powders, usually oxides and carbonates, are mixed thoroughly using a Ball mill. Solution chemistry processes such as coprecipitation, freeze-drying and sol–gel methods are alternative ways for preparing a homogeneous mixture. These powders are calcined in the temperature range from 1,070 to 1,220 K (800 to 950 °C) for several hours. The powders are cooled, reground and calcined again. This process is repeated several times to get homogeneous material. The powders are subsequently compacted to pellets and sintered. The sintering environment such as temperature, annealing time, atmosphere and cooling rate play a very important role in getting good high-T_{c} superconducting materials. The YBa_{2}Cu_{3}O_{7−x} compound is prepared by calcination and sintering of a homogeneous mixture of Y_{2}O_{3}, BaCO_{3} and CuO in the appropriate atomic ratio. Calcination is done at 1,070 to 1,220 K (800 to 950 °C), whereas sintering is done at 1,220 K (950 °C) in an oxygen atmosphere. The oxygen stoichiometry in this material is very crucial for obtaining a superconducting YBa_{2}Cu_{3}O_{7−x} compound. At the time of sintering, the semiconducting tetragonal YBa_{2}Cu_{3}O_{6} compound is formed, which, on slow cooling in oxygen atmosphere, turns into superconducting YBa_{2}Cu_{3}O_{7−x}. The uptake and loss of oxygen are reversible in YBa_{2}Cu_{3}O_{7−x}. A fully oxygenated orthorhombic YBa_{2}Cu_{3}O_{7−x} sample can be transformed into tetragonal YBa_{2}Cu_{3}O_{6} by heating in a vacuum at temperature above 973 K (700 °C).

The preparation of Bi-, Tl- and Hg-based high-T_{c} superconductors is more difficult than the YBCO preparation. Problems in these superconductors arise because of the existence of three or more phases having a similar layered structure. Thus, syntactic intergrowth and defects such as stacking faults occur during synthesis and it becomes difficult to isolate a single superconducting phase. For Bi–Sr–Ca–Cu–O, it is relatively simple to prepare the Bi-2212 (T_{c} ≈ 85 K) phase, whereas it is very difficult to prepare a single phase of Bi-2223 (T_{c} ≈ 110 K). The Bi-2212 phase appears only after few hours of sintering at 1,130–1,140 K (860–870 °C), but the larger fraction of the Bi-2223 phase is formed after a long reaction time of more than a week at 1,140 K (870 °C). Although the substitution of Pb in the Bi–Sr–Ca–Cu–O compound has been found to promote the growth of the high-T_{c} phase, a long sintering time is still required.

== History ==
Superconductor timeline. Cuprates are displayed as blue diamonds, magnesium diboride and other BCS superconductors are displayed as green circles, and iron-based superconductors as yellow squares. Cuprates are currently the highest temperature superconductors which are suitable for wires and magnets.

The first cuprate superconductor was found in 1986 in the non-stoichiometric cuprate lanthanum barium copper oxide by IBM researchers Georg Bednorz and Karl Alex Müller. The critical temperature for this material was 35K, well above the previous record of 23 K. The discovery led to a sharp increase in research on the cuprates, resulting in thousands of publications between 1986 and 2001. Bednorz and Müller were awarded the Nobel Prize in Physics in 1987, only a year after their discovery.

From 1986, many cuprate superconductors were identified, and can be put into three groups on a phase diagram critical temperature vs. oxygen hole content and copper hole content:

- lanthanum barium copper oxide (LB–CO), T_{C} = −240 °C (35 K).
- yttrium barium copper oxide (YB–CO), T_{C} = −215 °C (93 K).
- bismuth strontium calcium copper oxide (BiSC–CO), T_{C} = −180 °C (95 K).
- thallium barium calcium copper oxide (TBC–CO), T_{C} = −150 °C (125 K).
- mercury barium calcium copper oxide (HGBC–CO) 1993, with T_{C} = −140 °C (133 K), currently the highest cuprate critical temperature.

In 2018, the full three dimensional Fermi surface structure was derived from soft x-ray ARPES.

== Structure ==
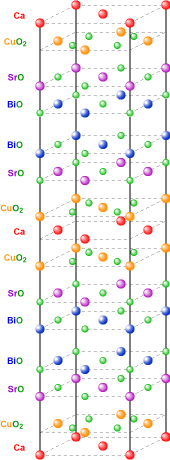
The unit cell of high-temperature cuprate superconductor BSCCO-2212

Cuprates are layered materials, consisting of superconducting planes of copper oxide, separated by layers containing ions such as lanthanum, barium, strontium, which act as a charge reservoir, doping electrons or holes into the copper-oxide planes. Thus the structure is described as a superlattice of superconducting CuO_{2} layers separated by spacer layers, resulting in a structure often closely related to the perovskite structure. Superconductivity takes place within the copper-oxide (CuO_{2}) sheets, with only weak coupling between adjacent CuO_{2} planes, making the properties close to that of a two-dimensional material. Electrical currents flow within the CuO_{2} sheets, resulting in a large anisotropy in normal conducting and superconducting properties, with a much higher conductivity parallel to the CuO_{2} plane than in the perpendicular direction.

Critical superconducting temperatures depend on the chemical compositions, cations substitutions and oxygen content. Chemical formulae of superconducting materials generally contain fractional numbers to describe the doping required for superconductivity. There are several families of cuprate superconductors which can be categorized by the elements they contain and the number of adjacent copper-oxide layers in each superconducting block. For example, YBCO and BSCCO can alternatively be referred to as Y123 and Bi2201/Bi2212/Bi2223 depending on the number of layers in each superconducting block (n). The superconducting transition temperature has been found to peak at an optimal doping value (p=0.16) and an optimal number of layers in each superconducting block, typically n=3.

The undoped "parent" or "mother" compounds are Mott insulators with long-range antiferromagnetic order at sufficiently low temperatures. Single band models are generally considered to be enough to describe the electronic properties.

Cuprate superconductors usually feature copper oxides in both the oxidation states 3+ and 2+. For example, YBa_{2}Cu_{3}O_{7} is described as Y^{3+}(Ba^{2+})_{2}(Cu^{3+})(Cu^{2+})_{2}(O^{2−})_{7}. The copper 2+ and 3+ ions tend to arrange themselves in a checkerboard pattern, a phenomenon known as charge ordering. All superconducting cuprates are layered materials having a complex structure described as a superlattice of superconducting CuO_{2} layers separated by spacer layers, where the misfit strain between different layers and dopants in the spacers induce a complex heterogeneity that in the superstripes scenario is intrinsic for high-temperature superconductivity.

== Superconducting mechanism ==
Schematic doping phase diagram of cuprate high-temperature superconductors

Superconductivity in the cuprates is considered unconventional and is not explained by BCS theory. Possible pairing mechanisms for cuprate superconductivity continue to be the subject of considerable debate and further research. Similarities between the low-temperature antiferromagnetic state in undoped materials and the low-temperature superconducting state that emerges upon doping, primarily the d_{x^{2}−y^{2}} orbital state of the Cu^{2+} ions, suggest that electron-phonon coupling is less relevant in cuprates. Recent work on the Fermi surface has shown that nesting occurs at four points in the antiferromagnetic Brillouin zone where spin waves exist and that the superconducting energy gap is larger at these points. The weak isotope effects observed for most cuprates contrast with conventional superconductors that are well described by BCS theory.

In 1987, Philip Anderson proposed that superexchange could act as a high-temperature superconductor pairing mechanism. In 2016, Chinese physicists found a correlation between a cuprate's critical temperature and the size of the charge transfer gap in that cuprate, providing support for the superexchange hypothesis. A 2022 study found that the varying density of actual Cooper pairs in a bismuth strontium calcium copper oxide superconductor matched with numerical predictions based on superexchange. But so far there is no consensus on the mechanism, and the search for an explanation continues.

Similarities and differences in the properties of hole-doped and electron-doped cuprates:

- Presence of a pseudogap phase up to at least optimal doping.
- Different trends in the Uemura plot relating transition temperature to superfluid density. The inverse square of the London penetration depth appears to be proportional to the critical temperature for a large number of underdoped cuprate superconductors, but the constant of proportionality is different for hole- and electron-doped cuprates. The linear trend implies that the physics of these materials is strongly two-dimensional.
- Universal hourglass-shaped feature in the spin excitations of cuprates measured using inelastic neutron diffraction.
- Nernst effect evident in both the superconducting and pseudogap phases.

Fig. 1. The Fermi surface of bi-layer BSCCO, calculated (left) and measured by ARPES (right). The dashed rectangle represents the first Brillouin zone.

The electronic structure of superconducting cuprates is highly anisotropic. Therefore, the Fermi surface of HTS is close to the Fermi surface of the doped CuO_{2} plane (or multi-planes, in case of multi-layer cuprates) and can be presented on the 2‑D reciprocal space (or momentum space) of the CuO_{2} lattice. The typical Fermi surface within the first CuO_{2} Brillouin zone is sketched in Figure 1 (left). It can be derived from the band structure calculations or measured by angle resolved photoemission spectroscopy (ARPES). Figure 1 shows the Fermi surface of BSCCO measured by ARPES. In a wide range of charge carrier concentration (doping level), in which the hole-doped HTS are superconducting, the Fermi surface is hole-like (i.e. open, as shown in Figure 1). This results in an inherent in-plane anisotropy of the electronic properties of HTS.

The structure of superconductor cuprates are often closely related to that of perovskites. Their structure has been described as a distorted, oxygen deficient, multi-layered, perovskite structure. One of the crystal structure properties of oxide superconductors is an alternating multi-layer of CuO_{2} planes with superconductivity between these layers. The more layers of CuO_{2}, the higher T_{c}. This structure causes a large anisotropy in normal conducting and superconducting properties, since electrical currents are carried by holes induced in the oxygen sites of the CuO_{2} sheets. The electrical conduction features a much higher conductivity parallel to the CuO_{2} plane than in the perpendicular direction.

Critical temperatures depend on the chemical compositions, cations substitutions and oxygen content. They can be classified as superstripes; i.e., particular realizations of superlattices at atomic limit made of superconducting atomic layers, wires, and dots separated by spacer layers, that together gives multiband and multigap superconductivity.

== Applications ==
BSCCO superconductors already have large-scale applications. For example, tens of kilometers of BSCCO-2223 at 77 K superconducting wires are being used in the current leads of the Large Hadron Collider at CERN (but the main field coils are using metallic lower temperature superconductors, mainly based on niobium–tin).

== See also ==
- Thallium barium calcium copper oxide
- Lanthanum barium copper oxide
- Bismuth strontium calcium copper oxide
- Superconducting wire

== Bibliography ==
- Rybicki et al, Perspective on the phase diagram of cuprate high-temperature superconductors, University of Leipzig, 2015 doi:10.1038/ncomms11413
