= Bismuth strontium calcium copper oxide =

Family of high-temperature superconductors

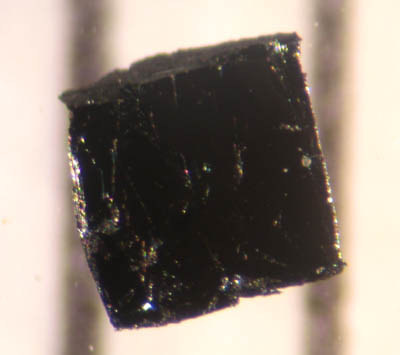
A piece of cuprate of bismuth and strontium: this piece is a cube with an edge of nearly 1 mm.

Bismuth strontium calcium copper oxide (BSCCO, pronounced /ˈbɪskoʊ/), is a type of cuprate superconductor having the generalized chemical formula Bi_{2}Sr_{2}Ca_{n−1}Cu_{n}O_{2n+4+x}, with n = 2 being the most commonly studied compound (though n = 1 and n = 3 have also received significant attention). Discovered as a general class in 1988, BSCCO was the first high-temperature superconductor which did not contain a rare-earth element.

It is a cuprate superconductor, an important category of high-temperature superconductors sharing a two-dimensional layered (perovskite) structure (see figure at right) with superconductivity taking place in a copper-oxide plane. BSCCO and yttrium barium copper oxide (YBCO) are the most studied cuprate superconductors.

Specific types of BSCCO are usually referred to using the sequence of the numbers of the metallic ions. Thus Bi-2201 is the n = 1 compound (Bi_{2}Sr_{2}CuO_{6+x}), Bi-2212 is the n = 2 compound (Bi_{2}Sr_{2}CaCu_{2}O_{8+x}), and Bi-2223 is the n = 3 compound (Bi_{2}Sr_{2}Ca_{2}Cu_{3}O_{10+x}).

The BSCCO family is analogous to a thallium family of high-temperature superconductors referred to as TBCCO and having the general formula Tl_{2}Ba_{2}Ca_{n−1}Cu_{n}O_{2n+4+x}, and a mercury family HBCCO of formula HgBa_{2}Ca_{n−1}Cu_{n}O_{2n+2+x}. There are a number of other variants of these superconducting families. In general, their critical temperature at which they become superconducting rises for the first few members and then falls. Thus Bi-2201 has T_{c} ≈ 33 K, Bi-2212 has T_{c} ≈ 96 K, Bi-2223 has T_{c} ≈ 108 K, and Bi-2234 has T_{c} ≈ 104 K. This last member is very difficult to synthesize.

== Wires and tapes ==
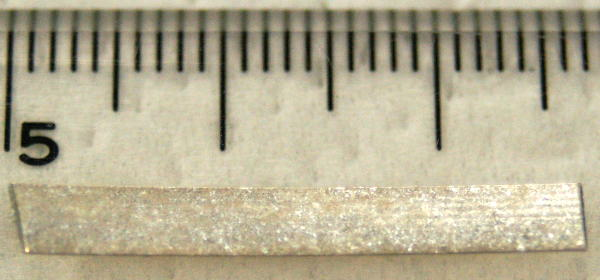
For practical applications, BSCCO is compressed with silver metal into tape by the powder-in-tube process

BSCCO was the first HTS material to be used for making practical superconducting wires. All HTS have an extremely short coherence length, of the order of 1.6 nm. This means that the grains in a polycrystalline wire must be in extremely good contact – they must be atomically smooth. Further, because the superconductivity resides substantially only in the copper-oxygen planes, the grains must be crystallographically aligned. BSCCO is therefore a good candidate because its grains can be aligned either by melt processing or by mechanical deformation. The double bismuth-oxide layer is only weakly bonded by van der Waals forces. So like graphite or mica, deformation causes slip on these BiO planes, and grains tend to deform into aligned plates. Further, because BSCCO has n = 1, 2 and 3 members, these naturally tend to accommodate low angle grain boundaries, so that indeed they remain atomically smooth. Thus, first-generation HTS wires (referred to as 1G) have been manufactured for many years now by companies such as American Superconductor Corporation (AMSC) in the USA and Sumitomo in Japan, though AMSC has now abandoned BSCCO wire in favour of 2G wire based on YBCO.

Typically, precursor powders are packed into a silver tube, which is then extruded down in diameter. These are then repacked as multiple tubes in a silver tube and again extruded down in diameter, then drawn down further in size and rolled into a flat tape. The last step ensures grain alignment. The tapes are then reacted at high temperature to form dense, crystallographically aligned Bi-2223 multifilamentary conducting tape suitable for winding cables or coils for transformers, magnets, motors and generators. Typical tapes of 4 mm width and 0.2 mm thickness support a current of 200 A at 77 K, giving a critical current density in the Bi-2223 filaments of 5 kA/mm^{2}. This rises markedly with decreasing temperature so that many applications are implemented at 30–35 K, even though T_{c} is 108 K.

== Applications ==
Electrical power transmission :

- 1G conductors made from Bi-2223 multifilamentary tapes. e.g. :
  - Holbrook Superconductor Project

Electromagnets and their current leads :

- Testing BSCCO tapes at CERN

== Discovery ==
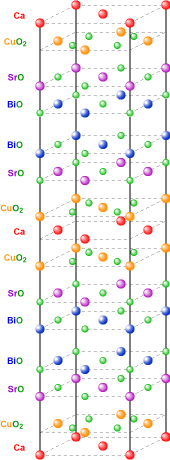
The crystal unit cell of BSCCO-2212, comprising two repeat units offset by (1/2,0,0). The other BSCCO family members have very similar structures: 2201 has one less CuO_{2} in its top and bottom half and no Ca layer, while 2223 has an extra CuO_{2} and Ca layer in each half.

BSCCO as a new class of superconductor was discovered around 1988 by Hiroshi Maeda and colleagues at the National Research Institute for Metals in Japan, though at the time they were unable to determine its precise composition and structure. Almost immediately several groups, and most notably Subramanian et al. at Dupont and Cava et al. at AT&T Bell Labs, identified Bi-2212. The n = 3 member proved quite elusive and was not identified until a month or so later by Tallon et al. in a government research lab in New Zealand. There have been only minor improvements to these materials since. A key early development was to replace about 15% of the Bi by Pb, which greatly accelerated the formation and quality of Bi-2223.

== Properties ==
BSCCO needs to be hole-doped by an excess of oxygen atoms (x in the formula) in order to superconduct. As in all high-temperature superconductors (HTS) T_{c} is sensitive to the exact doping level: the maximal T_{c} for Bi-2212 (as for most HTS) is achieved with an excess of about 0.16 holes per Cu atom. This is referred to as optimal doping. Samples with lower doping (and hence lower T_{c}) are generally referred to as underdoped, while those with excess doping (also lower T_{c}) are overdoped. By changing the oxygen content, T_{c} can thus be altered at will. By many measures, overdoped HTS are strong superconductors, even if their T_{c} is less than optimal, but underdoped HTS become extremely weak.

In 2026, superconductivity was demonstrated in a monolayer of Bi-2201 containing a single CuO_{2} plane. The optimal superconducting transition temperature of the monolayer was approximately 10% lower than that of thicker Bi-2201, demonstrating an effect of reduced dimensionality on its superconductivity. Controlled oxygenation allowed the researchers to tune the monolayer across an extended phase diagram; at low temperatures, an anomalous metal state was observed between the insulating and superconducting states, together with divergent critical behaviour near the superconductor–insulator transition.

The application of external pressure generally raises T_{c} in underdoped samples to values that well exceed the maximum at ambient pressure. This is not fully understood, though a secondary effect is that pressure increases the doping. Bi-2223 is complicated in that it has three distinct copper-oxygen planes. The two outer copper-oxygen layers are typically close to optimal doping, while the remaining inner layer is markedly underdoped. Thus the application of pressure in Bi-2223 results in T_{c} rising to a maximum of about 123 K due to optimization of the two outer planes. Following an extended decline, T_{c} then rises again towards 140 K due to optimization of the inner plane. A key challenge therefore is to determine how to optimize all copper-oxygen layers simultaneously.

BSCCO is a Type-II superconductor. The upper critical field H_{c2} in Bi-2212 polycrystalline samples at 4.2 K has been measured as 200 ± 25 T (cf 168 ± 26 T for YBCO polycrystalline samples). In practice, HTS are limited by the irreversibility field H*, above which magnetic vortices melt or decouple. Even though BSCCO has a higher upper critical field than YBCO it has a much lower H* (typically smaller by a factor of 100) thus limiting its use for making high-field magnets. It is for this reason that conductors of YBCO are preferred to BSCCO, though they are much more difficult to fabricate.

== See also ==
- Yttrium barium copper oxide
- Thallium barium calcium copper oxide
