= Georg Bednorz =

German physicist (born 1950)

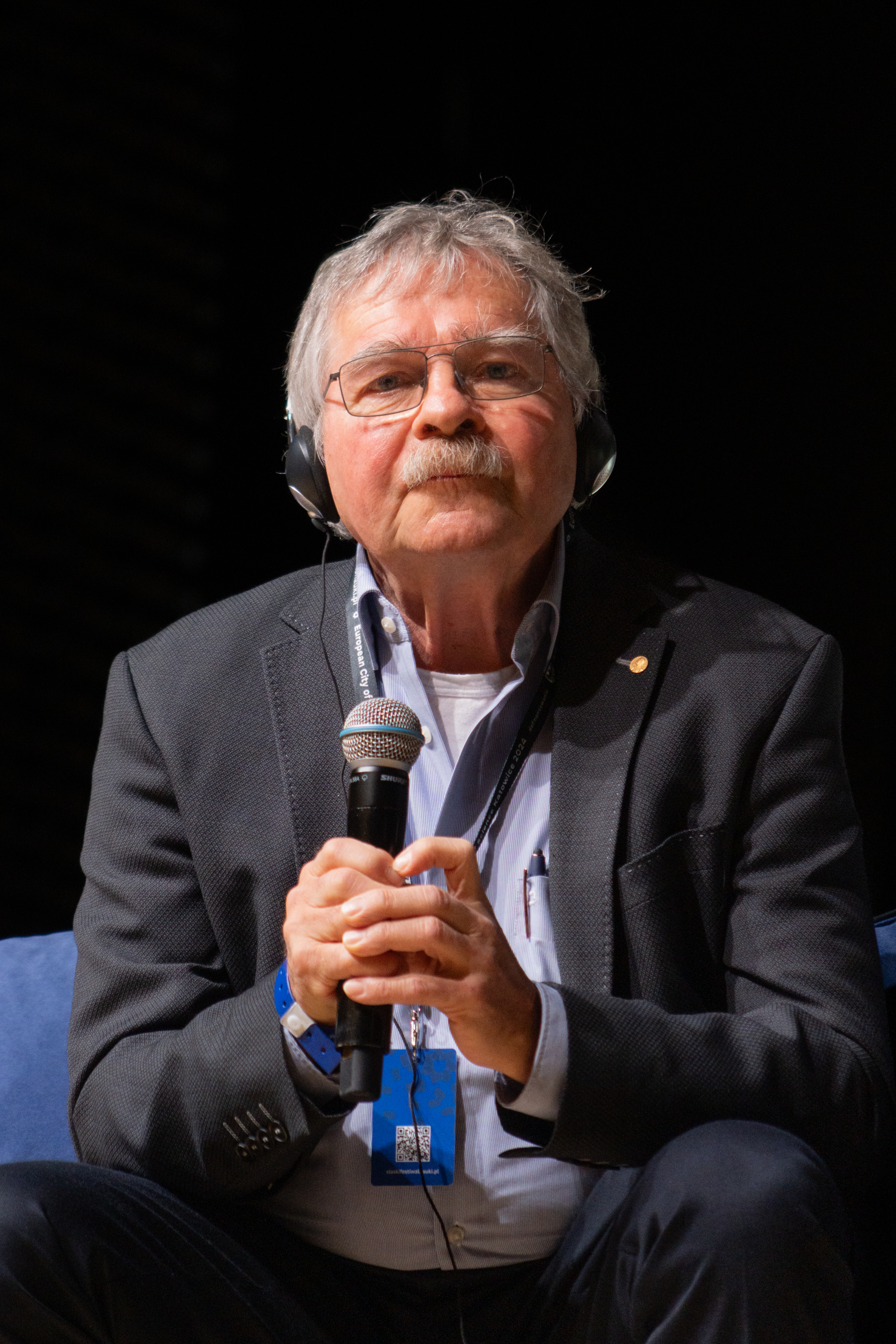
- Bednorz in 2013
- Born: Johannes Georg Bednorz; 16 May 1950 (age 76); Neuenkirchen, West Germany
- Education: University of Münster (grad. 1976); ETH Zurich (grad. 1982)
- Known for: Discovery of high-temperature superconductivity
- Spouse: Mechthild Wennemer
- Awards: Marcel Benoist Prize (1986); Nobel Prize in Physics (1987); Fritz London Memorial Prize (1987); Dannie Heineman Prize (1987); Klung Wilhelmy Science Award (1987); International Prize for New Materials (1988); EPS Europhysics Prize (1988)
- Scientific career
- Fields: Physics
- Workplaces: IBM Zurich Research Laboratory
- Thesis: Isovalent and heterovalent ionic substitution in SrTiO_{3} (1982)
- Doctoral advisors: Heini Gränicher; K. Alex Müller

Johannes Georg Bednorz (German: [ˈɡeːɔʁk ˈbɛdnɔʁt͡s]; born 16 May 1950) is a German physicist who, together with K. Alex Müller, discovered high-temperature superconductivity in ceramics, for which they shared the 1987 Nobel Prize in Physics.

== Biography ==
Johannes Georg Bednorz was born on 16 May 1950 in Neuenkirchen, North Rhine-Westphalia, the fourth child of Anton Bednorz, an elementary school teacher, and his wife Elisabeth, a piano teacher. His parents were both from Silesia in Central Europe, but were forced to move westwards in turbulences of World War II.

As a child, his parents tried to get him interested in classical music, but he was more practically inclined, preferring to work on motorcycles and cars. (Although as a teenager he did eventually learn to play the violin and trumpet.) In high school he developed an interest in the natural sciences, focusing on chemistry, which he could learn in a hands-on manner through experiments.

In 1968, Bednorz enrolled at the University of Münster to study chemistry. However, he soon felt lost in the large body of students, and opt to switch to the much less popular subject of crystallography, a subfield of mineralogy at the interface of chemistry and physics. In 1972, his teachers Wolfgang Hoffmann and Horst Böhm arranged for him to spend the summer at the IBM Zurich Research Laboratory as a visiting student. The experience here would shape his further career: not only did he meet his later collaborator K. Alex Müller, the head of the physics department, but he also experienced the atmosphere of creativity and freedom cultivated at the IBM lab, which he credits as a strong influence on his way of conducting science.

After another visit in 1973, Bednorz came to Zurich in 1974 for six months to do the experimental part of his master’s thesis. Here he grew crystals of SrTiO_{3}, a ceramic material belonging to the family of perovskites. Müller, himself interested in perovskites, urged him to continue his research. After graduating from Münster in 1976, Bednorz started a Ph.D at ETH Zurich under the supervision of Heini Gränicher and Alex Müller. In 1978, his future wife, Mechthild Wennemer, whom he had met in Münster, followed him to Zurich to start her own Ph.D.

After obtaining his Ph.D. in 1982, Bednorz joined the IBM lab. There, he joined Müller's ongoing research on superconductivity. The following year, Bednorz and Müller began a systematic study of the electrical properties of ceramics formed from transition metal oxides, and in 1986 they succeeded in inducing superconductivity in a lanthanum barium copper oxide (LaBaCuO, also known as LBCO). The oxide's critical temperature (T_{c}) was 35 K, a full 12 K higher than the previous record. This discovery stimulated a great deal of additional research in high-temperature superconductivity on cuprate materials with structures similar to LBCO, soon leading to the discovery of compounds such as BSCCO (T_{c} 107K) and YBCO (T_{c} 92K).

In 1987, Bednorz and Müller were jointly awarded the Nobel Prize in Physics "for their important break-through in the discovery of superconductivity in ceramic materials." The same year, Bednorz was appointed an IBM Fellow.

== Recognition ==
=== Awards ===
Year	Organization	Award	Citation	Ref.
1986	(Switzerland) Marcel Benoist Foundation	Marcel Benoist Prize (Note: Shared with K. Alex Müller.)	—	
1987	(Sweden) Royal Swedish Academy of Sciences	Nobel Prize in Physics	"For their important break-through in the discovery of superconductivity in ceramic materials."	
1987	(United States) Duke University	Fritz London Memorial Prize (Note: Shared with John Clarke, Jun Kondō, and K. Alex Müller.)	"For their pioneering work in the field of high T_{c} oxide superconductors. Their discovery of superconductivity in the barium lanthanum copper oxides has sparked a worldwide research effort which is making superconductivity a commercially important technology."	
1987	(West Germany) Göttingen Academy of Sciences and Humanities	Dannie Heineman Prize	"For their research in physics."	
1987	—	Klung Wilhelmy Science Award	"For his discovery of a new class of superconductors with unprecedented high transition temperatures."	
1988	(United States) American Physical Society	International Prize for New Materials (Note: Shared with Paul Ching Wu Chu and K. Alex Müller.)	"For discoveries of superconducting oxide materials with high transition temperatures."	
1988	(Switzerland) European Physical Society	EPS Europhysics Prize	"For the discovery of high-temperature superconductivity."	

=== Memberships ===
Year	Organization	Type	Ref.
2011	(Switzerland) Swiss Physical Society	Honorary Member	
2018	(United States) National Academy of Sciences	International Member	
