= Yttrium barium copper oxide =

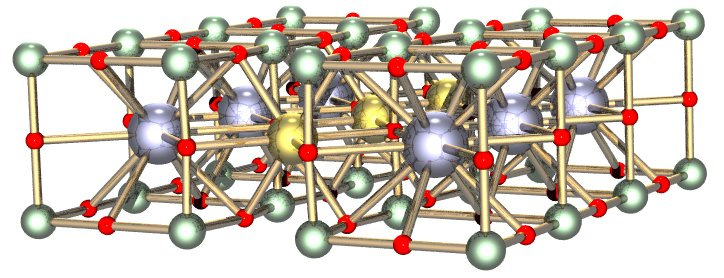
- Yttrium barium copper oxide structure

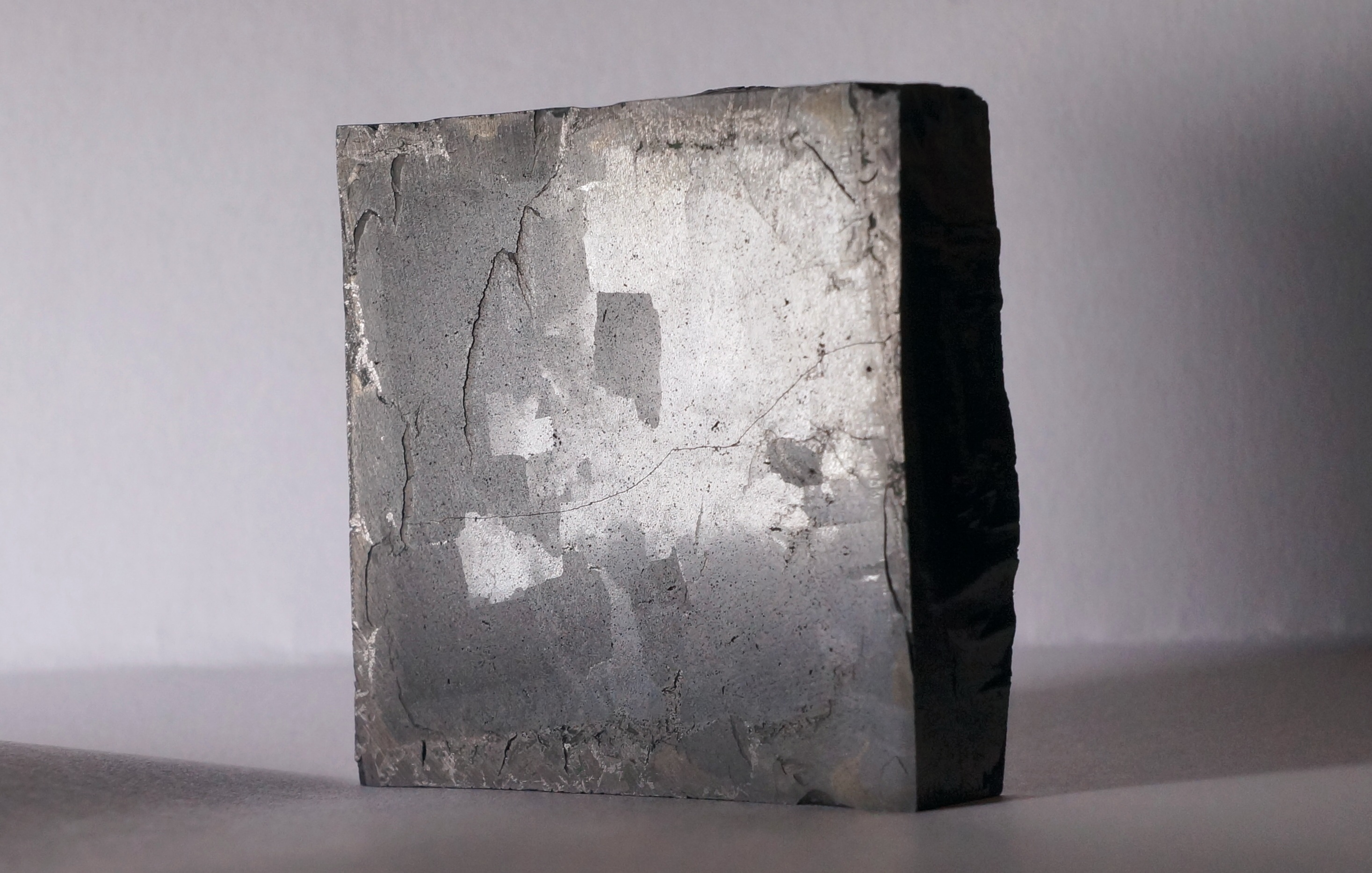
- Yttrium barium copper oxide crystal

Names
- IUPAC name barium copper yttrium oxide
- Other names YBCO, Y123, yttrium barium cuprate

Identifiers
CAS Number	107539-20-8
3D model (JSmol)	Interactive image
ChemSpider	17339938
ECHA InfoCard	100.121.379
EC Number	619-720-7
PubChem CID	21871996
CompTox Dashboard (EPA)	DTXSID90148081
- InChI: InChI=1S/2Ba.2Cu.7O.2Y/q4*+2;7*-2;2*+3 Key: YMLQHJRUACGKIM-UHFFFAOYSA-N
- SMILES: [O-2].[O-2].[O-2].[O-2].[O-2].[O-2].[O-2].[Cu+2].[Cu+2].[Y+3].[Y+3].[Ba+2].[Ba+2]

Properties
Chemical formula	YBa_{2}Cu_{3}O_{7}
Molar mass	666.19 g/mol
Appearance	Black solid
Density	6.4 g/cm^{3}
Melting point	>1000 °C
Solubility in water	Insoluble

Structure
Crystal structure	Based on the perovskite structure.
Coordination geometry	Orthorhombic

Hazards
- GHS labelling
Pictograms	(GHS07: Exclamation mark)
Signal word	Warning
Hazard statements	H302, H315, H319, H335
Precautionary statements	P261, P264, P270, P271, P280, P301+P312, P302+P352, P304+P340, P305+P351+P338, P312, P321, P330, P332+P313, P337+P313, P362, P403+P233, P405, P501

Related compounds
Related high-T_{c} superconductors	Cuprate superconductors
Related compounds	Yttrium(III) oxide Barium oxide Copper(II) oxide
- Except where otherwise noted, data are given for materials in their standard state (at 25 °C [77 °F], 100 kPa). verify (what is ?) Infobox references

Yttrium barium copper oxide (YBCO) is a family of crystalline chemical compounds that display high-temperature superconductivity; it includes the first material ever discovered to become superconducting above the boiling point of liquid nitrogen [77 K (−196.2 °C; −321.1 °F)] at about 93 K (−180.2 °C; −292.3 °F).

Many YBCO compounds have the general formula YBa_{2}Cu_{3}O_{7−x} (also known as Y123), although materials with other Y:Ba:Cu ratios exist, such as YBa_{2}Cu_{4}O_{y} (Y124) or Y_{2}Ba_{4}Cu_{7}O_{y} (Y247). At present, there is no singularly recognised theory for high-temperature superconductivity.

It is part of the more general group of rare-earth barium copper oxides (ReBCO) in which, instead of yttrium, other rare earths are present.

== History ==
In April 1986, Georg Bednorz and Karl Müller, working at IBM in Zurich, discovered that certain semiconducting oxides became superconducting at relatively high temperature, in particular, a lanthanum barium copper oxide becomes superconducting at 35 K. This oxide was an oxygen-deficient perovskite-related material that proved promising and stimulated the search for related compounds with higher superconducting transition temperatures. In 1987, Bednorz and Müller were jointly awarded the Nobel Prize in Physics for this work.

Following Bednorz and Müller's discovery, a team led by Paul Ching Wu Chu at the University of Alabama in Huntsville and University of Houston discovered that YBCO has a superconducting transition critical temperature (T_{c}) of 93 K. The first samples were Y_{1.2}Ba_{0.8}CuO_{4}, but this was an average composition for two phases, a black and a green one. Workers at Bell Laboratories identified the black phase as the superconductor, determined its composition YBa_{2}Cu_{3}O_{7−δ} and synthesized it in single phase

YBCO was the first material found to become superconducting above 77 K, the boiling point of liquid nitrogen, whereas the majority of other superconductors require more expensive cryogens. Nonetheless, YBCO and its many related materials have yet to displace superconductors requiring liquid helium for cooling.

== Synthesis ==
Relatively pure YBCO was first synthesized by heating a mixture of the metal carbonates at temperatures between 1000 and 1300 K.

4 BaCO_{3} + Y_{2}(CO_{3})_{3} + 6 CuCO_{3} + (1/2−x) O_{2} → 2 YBa_{2}Cu_{3}O_{7−x} + 13 CO_{2}

Modern syntheses of YBCO use the corresponding oxides and nitrates.

The superconducting properties of YBa_{2}Cu_{3}O_{7−x} are sensitive to the value of x, its oxygen content. Only those materials with 0 ≤ x ≤ 0.65 are superconducting below T_{c}, and when x ≈ 0.07, the material superconducts at the highest temperature of 95 K, or in highest magnetic fields: 120 T for B perpendicular and 250 T for B parallel to the CuO_{2} planes.

In addition to being sensitive to the stoichiometry of oxygen, the properties of YBCO are influenced by the crystallization methods used. Care must be taken to sinter YBCO. YBCO is a crystalline material, and the best superconductive properties are obtained when crystal grain boundaries are aligned by careful control of annealing and quenching temperature rates.

Numerous other methods to synthesize YBCO have developed since its discovery by Wu and his co-workers, such as chemical vapor deposition (CVD), sol-gel, and aerosol methods. These alternative methods, however, still require careful sintering to produce a quality product.

However, new possibilities have been opened since the discovery that trifluoroacetic acid (TFA), a source of fluorine, prevents the formation of the undesired barium carbonate (BaCO_{3}). Routes such as CSD (chemical solution deposition) have opened a wide range of possibilities, particularly in the preparation of long YBCO tapes. This route lowers the temperature necessary to get the correct phase to around 700 °C (973 K; 1,292 °F). This, and the lack of dependence on vacuum, makes this method a very promising way to get scalable YBCO tapes.

== Structure ==
Part of the lattice structure of yttrium barium copper oxide

YBCO crystallizes in a defect perovskite structure. It can be viewed as a layered structure: the boundary of each layer is defined by planes of square planar CuO_{4} units sharing 4 vertices. The planes can sometimes be slightly puckered. Perpendicular to these CuO_{4} planes are CuO_{2} ribbons sharing 2 vertices. The yttrium atoms are found between the CuO_{4} planes, while the barium atoms are found between the CuO_{2} ribbons and the CuO_{4} planes. This structural feature is illustrated in the figure to the right.

Coordination geometry of metal centres in YBCO
cubic {YO_{8}}	{BaO_{10}}	square planar {CuO_{4}}	square pyramidal {CuO_{5}}	YBa_{2}Cu_{3}O_{7-$\delta$} unit cell

puckered Cu plane	Cu ribbons

Like many type-II superconductors, YBCO can exhibit flux pinning: lines of magnetic flux may be pinned in place in a crystal, with a force required to move a piece from a particular magnetic field configuration. A piece of YBCO placed above a magnetic track can thus levitate at a fixed height.

Although YBa_{2}Cu_{3}O_{7} is a well-defined chemical compound with a specific structure and stoichiometry, materials with fewer than seven oxygen atoms per formula unit are non-stoichiometric compounds. The structure of these materials depends on the oxygen content. This non-stoichiometry is denoted by the x in the chemical formula YBa_{2}Cu_{3}O_{7−x}. When x = 1, the O(1) sites in the Cu(1) layer (as labelled in the unit cell) are vacant and the structure is tetragonal. The tetragonal form of YBCO is insulating and does not superconduct. Increasing the oxygen content slightly causes more of the O(1) sites to become occupied. For x < 0.65, Cu-O chains along the b axis of the crystal are formed. Elongation of the b axis changes the structure to orthorhombic, with lattice parameters of a = 3.82, b = 3.89, and c = 11.68 Å. Optimum superconducting properties occur when x ~ 0.07, i.e., almost all of the O(1) sites are occupied, with few vacancies.

In experiments where other elements are substituted on the Cu and Ba sites, evidence has shown that conduction occurs in the Cu(2)O planes while the Cu(1)O(1) chains act as charge reservoirs, which provide carriers to the CuO planes. However, this model fails to address superconductivity in the homologue Pr123 (praseodymium instead of yttrium). This (conduction in the copper planes) confines conductivity to the a-b planes and a large anisotropy in transport properties is observed. Along the c axis, normal conductivity is 10 times smaller than in the a-b plane. For other cuprates in the same general class, the anisotropy is even greater and inter-plane transport is highly restricted.

Furthermore, the superconducting length scales show similar anisotropy, in both penetration depth (λ_{ab} ≈ 150 nm, λ_{c} ≈ 800 nm) and coherence length, (ξ_{ab} ≈ 2 nm, ξ_{c} ≈ 0.4 nm). Although the coherence length in the a-b plane is 5 times greater than that along the c axis it is quite small compared to classic superconductors such as niobium (where ξ ≈ 40 nm). This modest coherence length means that the superconducting state is more susceptible to local disruptions from interfaces or defects on the order of a single unit cell, such as the boundary between twinned crystal domains. This sensitivity to small defects complicates fabricating devices with YBCO, and the material is also sensitive to degradation from humidity.

== Proposed applications ==
Critical current (KA/cm^{2}) vs absolute temperature (K), at different intensity of magnetic field (T) in YBCO prepared by infiltration-growth.

Many possible applications of this and related high temperature superconducting materials have been discussed. For example, superconducting materials are finding use as magnets in magnetic resonance imaging, magnetic levitation, and Josephson junctions. (The most used material for power cables and magnets is BSCCO.)

YBCO has yet to be used in many applications involving superconductors for two primary reasons:

- First, although single crystals of YBCO have a very high critical current density, polycrystals have a very low critical current density: only a small current can be passed while maintaining superconductivity. This problem is due to crystal grain boundaries in the material. When the grain boundary angle is greater than about 5°, the supercurrent cannot cross the boundary. The grain boundary problem can be controlled to some extent by preparing thin films via CVD or by texturing the material to align the grain boundaries.
- A second problem limiting the use of this material in technological applications is associated with processing of the material. Oxide materials such as this are brittle, and forming them into superconducting wires by any conventional process does not produce a useful superconductor. (Unlike BSCCO, the powder-in-tube process does not give good results with YBCO.)

The most promising method developed to utilize this material involves deposition of YBCO on flexible metal tapes coated with buffering metal oxides. This is known as coated conductor. Texture (crystal plane alignment) can be introduced into the metal tape (the RABiTS process) or a textured ceramic buffer layer can be deposited, with the aid of an ion beam, on an untextured alloy substrate (the IBAD process). Subsequent oxide layers prevent diffusion of the metal from the tape into the superconductor while transferring the template for texturing the superconducting layer. Novel variants on CVD, PVD, and solution deposition techniques are used to produce long lengths of the final YBCO layer at high rates. Companies pursuing these processes include American Superconductor, Superpower (a division of Furukawa Electric), Sumitomo, Fujikura, Nexans Superconductors, Commonwealth Fusion Systems, and European Advanced Superconductors. A much larger number of research institutes have also produced YBCO tape by these methods.

The superconducting tape is used for SPARC, a tokamak fusion reactor design.

== Surface modification ==
Surface modification of materials has often led to new and improved properties. Corrosion inhibition, polymer adhesion and nucleation, preparation of organic superconductor/insulator/high-T_{c} superconductor trilayer structures, and the fabrication of metal/insulator/superconductor tunnel junctions have been developed using surface-modified YBCO.

These molecular layered materials are synthesized using cyclic voltammetry. Thus far, YBCO layered with alkylamines, arylamines, and thiols have been produced with varying stability of the molecular layer. It has been proposed that amines act as Lewis bases and bind to Lewis acidic Cu surface sites in YBa_{2}Cu_{3}O_{7} to form stable coordination bonds.

== Mass production ==
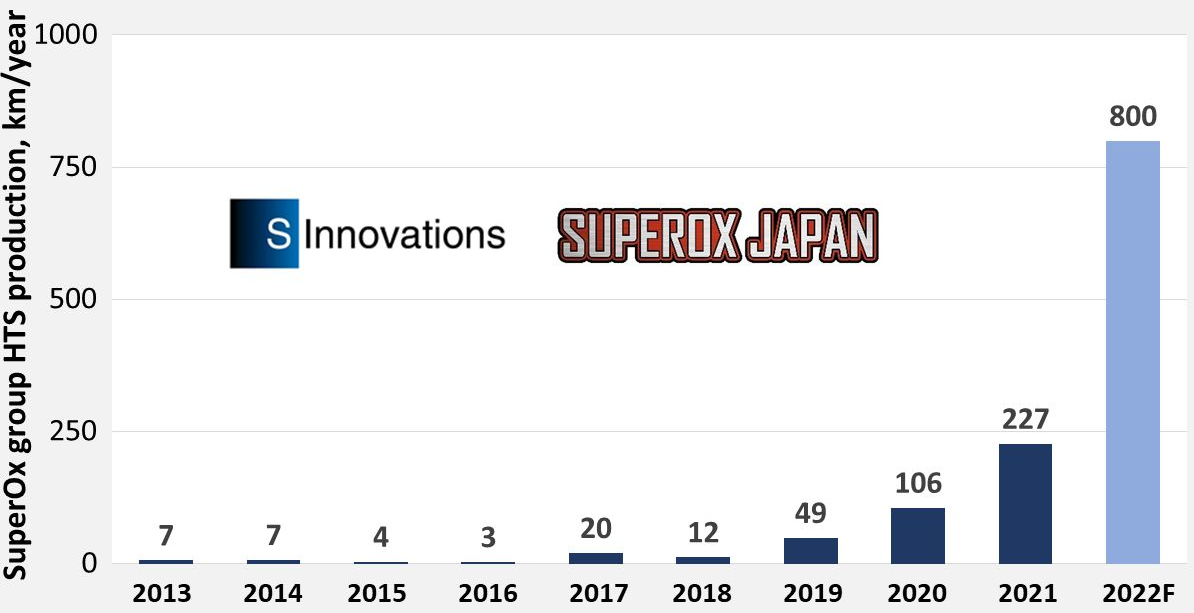
SuperOx was able to produce over 300 km of YBCO in 9 months for use in a fusion magnet.

In 1987, shortly after it was discovered, physicist and science author Paul Grant published in the U.K. Journal New Scientist a straightforward guide for synthesizing YBCO superconductors using widely-available equipment. Thanks in part to this article and similar publications at the time, YBCO has become a popular high-temperature superconductor for use by hobbyists and in education, as the magnetic levitation effect can be easily demonstrated using liquid nitrogen as coolant.

In 2021, SuperOx, a Russian and Japanese company, developed a new manufacturing process for making YBCO wire for fusion reactors. This new wire was shown to conduct between 700 and 2000 Amps per square millimeter. The company was able to produce over 300 km (186 mi) of 4mm wide wire in 9 months, between 2019 and 2021, dramatically improving the production capacity. The company used a plasma-laser deposition process, on a electropolished substrate to make 12 mm wide wire, which was then mechanically slit 4 mm wide.
