= High-temperature superconductivity =

Superconductive behavior at temperatures much higher than absolute zero

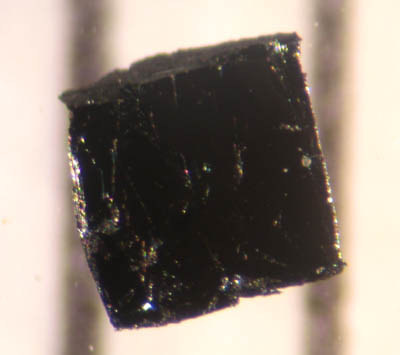
A sample of bismuth strontium calcium copper oxide (BSCCO), which is currently one of the most practical high-temperature superconductors. Notably, it does not contain rare earths. BSCCO is a cuprate superconductor based on bismuth and strontium. Thanks to its higher operating temperature, cuprates are now becoming competitors for more ordinary niobium-based superconductors, as well as magnesium diboride superconductors.

High-temperature superconductivity (high-T_{c} or HTS) is superconductivity in materials with a critical temperature (the temperature below which the material behaves as a superconductor) above 77 K (−196.2 °C; −321.1 °F), the boiling point of liquid nitrogen. They are "high-temperature" only relative to previously known superconductors, which function only closer to absolute zero. The first high-temperature superconductor was discovered in 1986 by IBM researchers Georg Bednorz and K. Alex Müller. Although the critical temperature is around 35.1 K (−238.1 °C; −396.5 °F), this material was modified by Ching-Wu Chu to make the first high-temperature superconductor with critical temperature 93 K (−180.2 °C; −292.3 °F). Bednorz and Müller were awarded the Nobel Prize in Physics in 1987 "for their important break-through in the discovery of superconductivity in ceramic materials". Most high-T_{c} materials are type-II superconductors.

The major advantage of high-temperature superconductors is that they can be cooled using liquid nitrogen, in contrast to previously known superconductors, which require expensive and hard-to-handle coolants, primarily liquid helium. A second advantage of high-T_{c} materials is they retain their superconductivity in higher magnetic fields than previous materials. This is important when constructing superconducting magnets, a primary application of high-T_{c} materials.

The majority of high-temperature superconductors are ceramics, rather than the previously known metallic materials. Ceramic superconductors are suitable for some practical uses but encounter manufacturing issues. For example, most ceramics are brittle, which complicates wire fabrication.

The main class of high-temperature superconductors is copper oxides combined with other metals, especially the rare-earth barium copper oxides (REBCOs) such as yttrium barium copper oxide (YBCO). The second class of high-temperature superconductors in the practical classification is the iron-based compounds. Magnesium diboride is sometimes included in high-temperature superconductors: It is relatively simple to manufacture, but it superconducts only below 39 K (−234.2 °C), which makes it unsuitable for liquid nitrogen cooling.

== History ==
Timeline of superconductor discoveries. On the right is the liquid nitrogen temperature, which usually divides superconductors at high from superconductors at low temperatures. Cuprates are displayed as blue diamonds, and iron-based superconductors as yellow squares. Magnesium diboride and other low-temperature or high-pressure metallic BCS superconductors are displayed for reference as green circles.

Superconductivity was discovered by Kamerlingh Onnes in 1911, in a metal solid. Ever since, researchers have attempted to create superconductivity at higher temperatures with the goal of finding a room-temperature superconductor. By the late 1970s, superconductivity was observed in several metallic compounds (in particular Nb-based, such as NbTi, Nb_{3}Sn, and Nb_{3}Ge) at temperatures that were much higher than those for elemental metals and which could even exceed 20 K (−253.2 °C).

In 1986, at the IBM research lab near Zürich in Switzerland, Bednorz and Müller were looking for superconductivity in a new class of ceramics: the copper oxides, or cuprates. In that year, Bednorz and Müller discovered superconductivity in lanthanum barium copper oxide (LBCO), a lanthanum-based cuprate perovskite material, which had a transition temperature of 35 K (Nobel Prize in Physics, 1987). It was soon found that replacing the lanthanum with yttrium (i.e., making YBCO) raised the critical temperature above 90 K. Their results were soon confirmed by many groups.

In 1987, Philip W. Anderson gave the first theoretical description of these materials, based on the resonating valence bond (RVB) theory, but a full understanding of these materials is still developing today. These superconductors are now known to possess a d-wave pair symmetry. The first proposal that high-temperature cuprate superconductivity involves d-wave pairing was made in 1987 by N. E. Bickers, Douglas James Scalapino and R. T. Scalettar, followed by three subsequent theories in 1988 by Masahiko Inui, Sebastian Doniach, Peter J. Hirschfeld and Andrei E. Ruckenstein, using spin-fluctuation theory, and by Claudius Gros, Didier Poilblanc, Maurice T. Rice and FC. Zhang, and by Gabriel Kotliar and Jialin Liu identifying d-wave pairing as a natural consequence of the RVB theory. The confirmation of the d-wave nature of the cuprate superconductors was made by a variety of experiments, including the direct observation of the d-wave nodes in the excitation spectrum through angle resolved photoemission spectroscopy (ARPES), the observation of a half-integer flux in tunneling experiments, and indirectly from the temperature dependence of the penetration depth, specific heat and thermal conductivity.

Until 2001 the cuprates were thought be the only true high temperature superconductors. In that year MgB_{2} with T_{c} of 39K was discovered by Akimitsu and colleagues. This was followed in 2006 by Hosono and coworkers with iron-based layered oxypnictide compound with T_{c} of 56K. These temperature are below the cuprates but well above the conventional superconductors.

In 2014, evidence showing that fractional particles can happen in quasi two-dimensional magnetic materials was reported by École Polytechnique Fédérale de Lausanne (EPFL) scientists lending support for Anderson's theory of high-temperature superconductivity. In 2014 and 2015, hydrogen sulfide (H_{2}S) at extremely high pressures (around 150 gigapascals) was first predicted and then confirmed to be a high-temperature superconductor with a transition temperature of 80 K.

In 2018, a research team from the Department of Physics, Massachusetts Institute of Technology, discovered superconductivity in bilayer graphene with one layer twisted at an angle of approximately 1.1 degrees with cooling and applying a small electric charge. Even if the experiments were not carried out in a high-temperature environment, the results are correlated less to classical but high temperature superconductors, given that no foreign atoms needed to be introduced. The superconductivity effect came about as a result of electrons twisted into a vortex between the graphene layers, called "skyrmions". These act as a single particle and can pair up across the graphene's layers, leading to the basic conditions required for superconductivity.

In 2019 it was discovered that lanthanum hydride (LaH_{10}) becomes a superconductor at 250 K under a pressure of 170 gigapascals.

In 2020, a room-temperature superconductor (critical temperature 288 K) made from hydrogen, carbon and sulfur under pressures of around 270 gigapascals was described in a paper in Nature. However, in 2022 the article was retracted by the editors because the validity of background subtraction procedures had been called into question. All nine authors maintain that the raw data strongly support the main claims of the paper.

As of 2021, the superconductor with the highest transition temperature at ambient pressure was the cuprate of mercury, barium, and calcium, at around 133 K (−140 °C). Other superconductors have higher recorded transition temperatures – for example lanthanum superhydride at 250 K (−23 °C), but these only occur at high pressure.

In 2023 a study reported superconductivity at room temperature and ambient pressure in highly oriented pyrolytic graphite with dense arrays of nearly parallel line defects.

== Selected list of superconductors ==
Superconductors Cooling agents

Selection of confirmed superconductors and common cooling agents
T_{c}/T_{boiling}		Pressure above ambient	Material	Notes
K	°C	Pressure above ambient	Material	Notes
273.15	0		Ice: Melting point at atmospheric pressure (common cooling agent; for reference)	
250	−23	170 GPa	LaH_{10}	Metallic superconductor with one of the highest known critical temperatures
203	−70	155 GPa	High pressure phase of hydrogen sulfide (H_{2}S)	Mechanism unclear, observable isotope effect
194.6	−78.5		Carbon dioxide (dry ice): Sublimation point at atmospheric pressure (common cooling agent; for reference)	
151	−122		HgBa_{2}Ca_{2}Cu_{3}O_{8+δ}	High-temperature superconductors with copper oxide with relatively high critical temperatures
138	−135		Hg_{12}Tl_{3}Ba_{30}Ca_{30}Cu_{45}O_{127}	High-temperature superconductors with copper oxide with relatively high critical temperatures
110	−163		Bi_{2}Sr_{2}Ca_{2}Cu_{3}O_{10} (BSCCO)	High-temperature superconductors with copper oxide with relatively high critical temperatures
92	−181		YBa_{2}Cu_{3}O_{7} (YBCO)	High-temperature superconductors with copper oxide with relatively high critical temperatures
87	−186		Argon: Boiling point at atmospheric pressure (common cooling agent; for reference)	
77	−196		Nitrogen: Boiling point at atmospheric pressure (common cooling agent; for reference)	
45	−228		SmFeAsO_{0.85}F_{0.15}	Low-temperature superconductors with relatively high critical temperatures
41	−232		CeOFeAs	Low-temperature superconductors with relatively high critical temperatures
39	−234		MgB_{2}	Metallic superconductor with relatively high critical temperature at atmospheric pressure
30	−243		La_{2−x}Ba_{x}CuO_{4}	First high-temperature superconductor with copper oxide, discovered by Bednorz and Müller
27	−246		Neon: Boiling point at atmospheric pressure (common cooling agent; for reference)	
21.15	−252		Hydrogen: Boiling point at atmospheric pressure (common cooling agent; for reference)	
18	−255		Nb_{3}Sn	Metallic low-temperature superconductors with technical relevance
9.2	−264.0		NbTi	Metallic low-temperature superconductors with technical relevance
4.21	−268.94		Helium: Boiling point at atmospheric pressure (common cooling agent of low temperature physics; for reference)	
4.15	−269.00		Hg (Mercury)	Metallic low-temperature superconductors
1.09	−272.06		Ga (Gallium)	Metallic low-temperature superconductors

== Properties ==
The "high-temperature" superconductor class has had many definitions.

The label high-T_{c} should be reserved for materials with critical temperatures greater than the boiling point of liquid nitrogen. However, a number of materials – including the original discovery and recently discovered pnictide superconductors – have critical temperatures below 77 K (−196.2 °C) but nonetheless are commonly referred to in publications as high-T_{c} class.

A substance with a critical temperature above the boiling point of liquid nitrogen, together with a high critical magnetic field and critical current density (above which superconductivity is destroyed), would greatly benefit technological applications. In magnet applications, the high critical magnetic field may prove more valuable than the high T_{c} itself. Some cuprates have an upper critical field of about 100 tesla. However, cuprate materials are brittle ceramics that are expensive to manufacture and not easily turned into wires or other useful shapes. Furthermore, high-temperature superconductors do not form large, continuous superconducting domains, rather clusters of microdomains within which superconductivity occurs. They are therefore unsuitable for applications requiring actual superconductive currents, such as magnets for magnetic resonance spectrometers. For a solution to this (powders), see HTS wire.

There has been considerable debate regarding high-temperature superconductivity coexisting with magnetic ordering in YBCO, iron-based superconductors, several ruthenocuprates and other exotic superconductors, and the search continues for other families of materials. HTS are Type-II superconductors, which allow magnetic fields to penetrate their interior in quantized units of flux, meaning that much higher magnetic fields are required to suppress superconductivity. The layered structure also gives a directional dependence to the magnetic field response.

All known high-T_{c} superconductors are Type-II superconductors. In contrast to Type-I superconductors, which expel all magnetic fields due to the Meissner effect, Type-II superconductors allow magnetic fields to penetrate their interior in quantized units of flux, creating "holes" or "tubes" of normal metallic regions in the superconducting bulk called vortices. Consequently, high-T_{c} superconductors can sustain much higher magnetic fields.

=== Cuprates ===
Cuprate superconductors are a family of high-temperature superconducting materials made of layers of copper oxides (CuO_{2}) alternating with layers of other metal oxides, which act as charge reservoirs. At ambient pressure, cuprate superconductors are the highest temperature superconductors known.

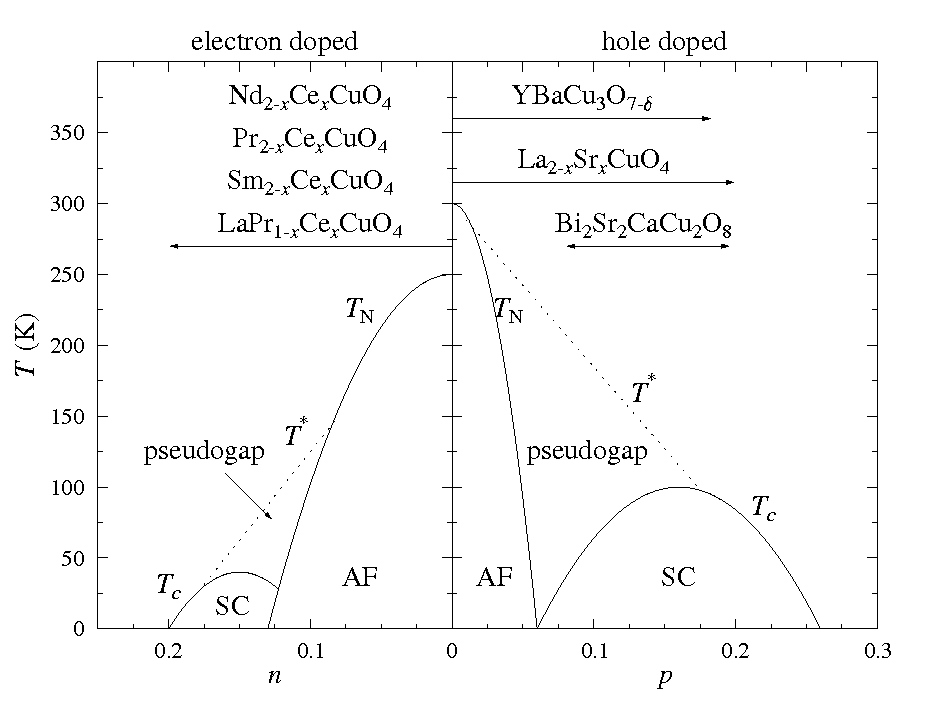
Phase diagram of cuprate superconductors: They can be basically split into electron (n) and hole (p) doped cuprates, as for the basic models describing semiconductors. Both standard cuprate superconductors, YBCO and BSCCO, are notably hole-doped.

Cuprates have a structure close to that of a two-dimensional material. Their superconducting properties are determined by electrons moving within weakly coupled copper-oxide (CuO_{2}) layers. Neighbouring layers contain ions such as lanthanum, barium, strontium, or other atoms that act to stabilize the structures and dope electrons or holes onto the copper-oxide layers. The undoped "parent" or "mother" compounds are Mott insulators with long-range antiferromagnetic order at sufficiently low temperatures. Single band models are generally considered to be enough to describe the electronic properties.

The cuprate superconductors adopt a perovskite structure. The copper-oxide planes are checkerboard lattices with squares of O^{2−} ions with a Cu^{2+} ion at the centre of each square. The unit cell is rotated by 45° from these squares. Chemical formulae of superconducting materials contain fractional numbers to describe the doping required for superconductivity.

Several families of cuprate superconductors have been identified. They can be categorized by their elements and the number of adjacent copper-oxide layers in each superconducting block. For example, YBCO and BSCCO can be referred to as Y123 and Bi2201/Bi2212/Bi2223 depending on the number of layers in each superconducting block (n). The superconducting transition temperature peaks at an optimal doping value (p=0.16) and an optimal number of layers in each block, typically three.

Possible mechanisms for cuprate superconductivity remain the subject of considerable debate and research. Similarities between the low-temperature state of undoped materials and the superconducting state that emerges upon doping, primarily the d_{x^{2}−y^{2}} orbital state of the Cu^{2+} ions, suggest that electron–electron interactions are more significant than electron–phonon interactions in cuprates – making the superconductivity unconventional. Recent work on the Fermi surface has shown that nesting occurs at four points in the antiferromagnetic Brillouin zone where spin waves exist and that the superconducting energy gap is larger at these points. The weak isotope effects observed for most cuprates contrast with conventional superconductors that are well described by BCS theory.

=== Iron-based ===
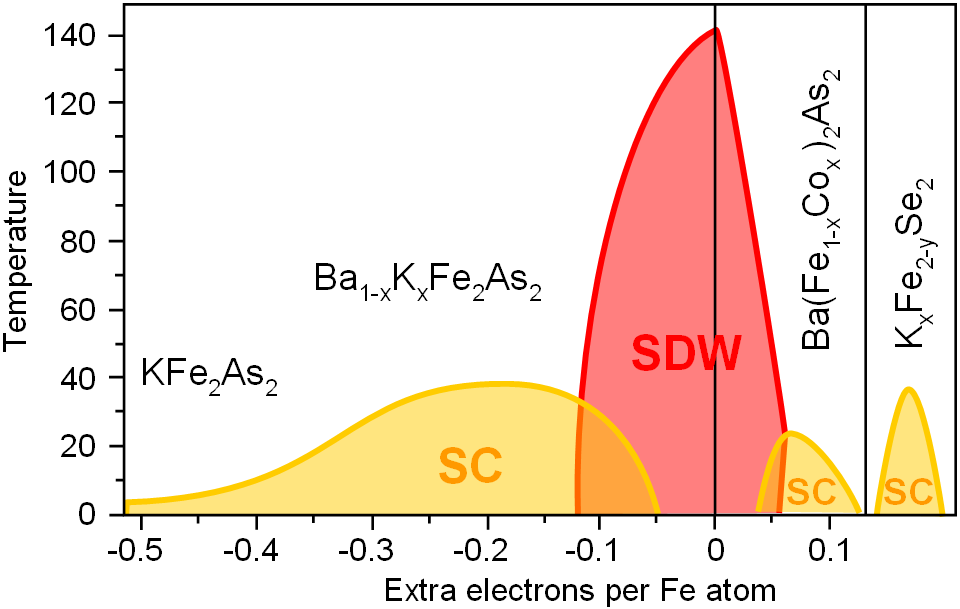
Phase diagram for high-temperature superconductors based on iron

Iron-based superconductors contain layers of iron and a pnictogen – such as arsenic or phosphorus – , a chalcogen, or a crystallogen. This is currently the family with the second highest critical temperature, behind the cuprates. Interest in their superconducting properties began in 2006 with the discovery of superconductivity in LaFePO at 4 K (−269.15 °C) and gained much greater attention in 2008 after the analogous material LaFeAs(O,F) was found to superconduct at up to 43 K (−230.2 °C) under pressure. The highest critical temperatures in the iron-based superconductor family exist in thin films of FeSe, where a critical temperature in excess of 100 K (−173 °C) was reported in 2014.

Since the original discoveries several families of iron-based superconductors have emerged:

- LnFeAs(O,F) or LnFeAsO_{1−x} (Ln=lanthanide) with T_{c} up to 56 K (−217.2 °C), referred to as 1111 materials. A fluoride variant of these materials was subsequently found with similar T_{c} values.
- (Ba,K)Fe_{2}As_{2} and related materials with pairs of iron-arsenide layers, referred to as 122 compounds. T_{c} values range up to 38 K (−235.2 °C). These materials also superconduct when iron is replaced with cobalt.
- LiFeAs and NaFeAs with T_{c} up to around 20 K (−253.2 °C). These materials superconduct close to stoichiometric composition and are referred to as 111 compounds.
- FeSe with small off-stoichiometry or tellurium doping.
- LaFeSiH with T_{c} around 11 K (−262.1 °C) in its stoichiometric composition. This superconducting crystallogenide has oxide and fluoride variants LaFeSiO_{x} and LaFeSiF_{x}.

Most undoped iron-based superconductors show a tetragonal-orthorhombic structural phase transition followed at lower temperature by magnetic ordering, similar to the cuprate superconductors. However, they are poor metals rather than Mott insulators and have five bands at the Fermi surface rather than one. The phase diagram emerging as the iron-arsenide layers are doped is remarkably similar, with the superconducting phase close to or overlapping the magnetic phase. Strong evidence that the T_{c} value varies with the As–Fe–As bond angles has already emerged and shows that the optimal T_{c} value is obtained with undistorted FeAs_{4} tetrahedra. The symmetry of the pairing wavefunction is still widely debated, but an extended s-wave scenario is currently favoured.

=== Magnesium diboride ===
Magnesium diboride is occasionally referred to as a high-temperature superconductor because its T_{c} value of 39 K (−234.2 °C) is above that historically expected for BCS superconductors. However, it is more generally regarded as the highest T_{c} conventional superconductor, the increased T_{c} resulting from two separate bands being present at the Fermi level.

=== Carbon-based ===
In 1991 Hebard et al. discovered Fulleride superconductors, where alkali-metal atoms are intercalated into C_{60} molecules.

In 2008 Ganin et al. demonstrated superconductivity at temperatures of up to 38 K (−235.2 °C) for Cs_{3}C_{60}.

P-doped Graphane was proposed in 2010 to be capable of sustaining high-temperature superconductivity.

On 31 December 2023 "Global Room-Temperature Superconductivity in Graphite" was published in the journal Advanced Quantum Technologies, claiming to demonstrate superconductivity at room temperature and ambient pressure in highly oriented pyrolytic graphite with dense arrays of nearly parallel line defects.

=== Nickelates ===
In 1999, Anisimov et al. conjectured superconductivity in nickelates, proposing nickel oxides as direct analogs to the cuprate superconductors. Superconductivity in an infinite-layer nickelate, Nd_{0.8}Sr_{0.2}NiO_{2}, was reported at the end of 2019 with a superconducting transition temperature between 9 and 15 K (−264.15 and −258.15 °C). This superconducting phase is observed in oxygen-reduced thin films created by the pulsed laser deposition of Nd_{0.8}Sr_{0.2}NiO_{3} onto SrTiO_{3} substrates that is then reduced to Nd_{0.8}Sr_{0.2}NiO_{2} via annealing the thin films at 533–553 K (260–280 °C) in the presence of CaH_{2}. The superconducting phase is only observed in the oxygen reduced film and is not seen in oxygen reduced bulk material of the same stoichiometry, suggesting that the strain induced by the oxygen reduction of the Nd_{0.8}Sr_{0.2}NiO_{2} thin film changes the phase space to allow for superconductivity. Of important is further to extract access hydrogen from the reduction with CaH_{2}, otherwise topotactic hydrogen may prevent superconductivity.

== Production ==
Liquid nitrogen can be produced relatively cheaply, even on-site. The higher temperatures additionally help to avoid some of the problems that arise at liquid helium temperatures, such as the formation of plugs of frozen air that can block cryogenic lines and cause unanticipated and potentially hazardous pressure buildup.

== Ongoing research ==
The question of how superconductivity arises in high-temperature superconductors is one of the major unsolved problems of theoretical condensed matter physics. The mechanism that causes the electrons in these crystals to form pairs is not known. Despite intensive research and many promising leads, an explanation has so far eluded scientists. One reason for this is that the materials in question are generally very complex, multi-layered crystals (for example, BSCCO), making theoretical modelling difficult.

Improving the quality and variety of samples also gives rise to considerable research, both with the aim of improved characterisation of the physical properties of existing compounds, and synthesizing new materials, often with the hope of increasing T_{c}. Technological research focuses on making HTS materials in sufficient quantities to make their use economically viable as well as in optimizing their properties in relation to applications.

In March 2026, University of Houston researchers reported a superconducting material exhibiting a critical temperature of approximately 151 K at ambient pressure. This new record without sustained high-pressure conditions was achieved using a "pressure quenching" technique. This exceeded the previous ambient-pressure record of 133 K.

== Theoretical models ==
Multiple hypotheses attempt to account for HTS.

=== Resonating valence bond theory ===
Spin fluctuation hypothesis proposed that electron pairing in high-temperature superconductors is mediated by short-range spin waves known as paramagnons.

Gubser, Hartnoll, Herzog, and Horowitz proposed holographic superconductivity, which uses holographic duality or AdS/CFT correspondence theory as a possible explanation of high-temperature superconductivity in certain materials.

Weak coupling theory suggests superconductivity emerges from antiferromagnetic spin fluctuations in a doped system. It predicts that the pairing wave function of cuprate HTS should have a d_{x}^{2}-y^{2} symmetry. Thus, determining whether the pairing wave function has d-wave symmetry is essential to test the spin fluctuation mechanism. That is, if the HTS order parameter (a pairing wave function as in Ginzburg–Landau theory) does not have d-wave symmetry, then a pairing mechanism related to spin fluctuations can be ruled out. (Similar arguments can be made for iron-based superconductors but the different material properties allow a different pairing symmetry.)

Interlayer coupling theory proposes that a layered structure consisting of BCS-type (s-wave symmetry) superconductors can explain superconductivity by itself. By introducing an additional tunnelling interaction between layers, this model explained the anisotropic symmetry of the order parameter as well as the emergence of HTS.

In order to resolve this question, experiments such as photoemission spectroscopy, NMR, specific heat measurements, were conducted. The results remain ambiguous, with some reports supporting d symmetry, with others supporting s symmetry.

Such explanations assume that superconductive properties can be treated by mean-field theory. It also does not consider that in addition to the superconductive gap, the pseudogap must be explained. The cuprate layers are insulating, and the superconductors are doped with interlayer impurities to make them metallic.

The transition temperature can be maximized by varying the dopant concentration. The simplest example is La_{2}CuO_{4}, which consists of alternating CuO_{2} and LaO layers that are insulating when pure. When 8% of the La is replaced by Sr, the latter acts as a dopant, contributing holes to the CuO_{2} layers, and making the sample metallic. The Sr impurities also act as electronic bridges, enabling interlayer coupling. Proceeding from this picture, some theories argue that the pairing interaction is with phonons, as in conventional superconductors with Cooper pairs. While the undoped materials are antiferromagnetic, even a few percent of impurity dopants introduce a smaller pseudogap in the CuO_{2} planes that is also caused by phonons. The gap decreases with increasing charge carriers, and as it nears the superconductive gap, the latter reaches its maximum. The transition temperature is then argued to be due to the percolating behaviour of the carriers, which follow zig-zag percolative paths, largely in metallic domains in the CuO_{2} planes, until blocked by charge density wave domain walls, where they use dopant bridges to cross over to a metallic domain of an adjacent CuO_{2} plane. The transition temperature maxima are reached when the host lattice has weak bond-bending forces, which produce strong electron–phonon interactions at the interlayer dopants.

=== D symmetry in YBCO ===
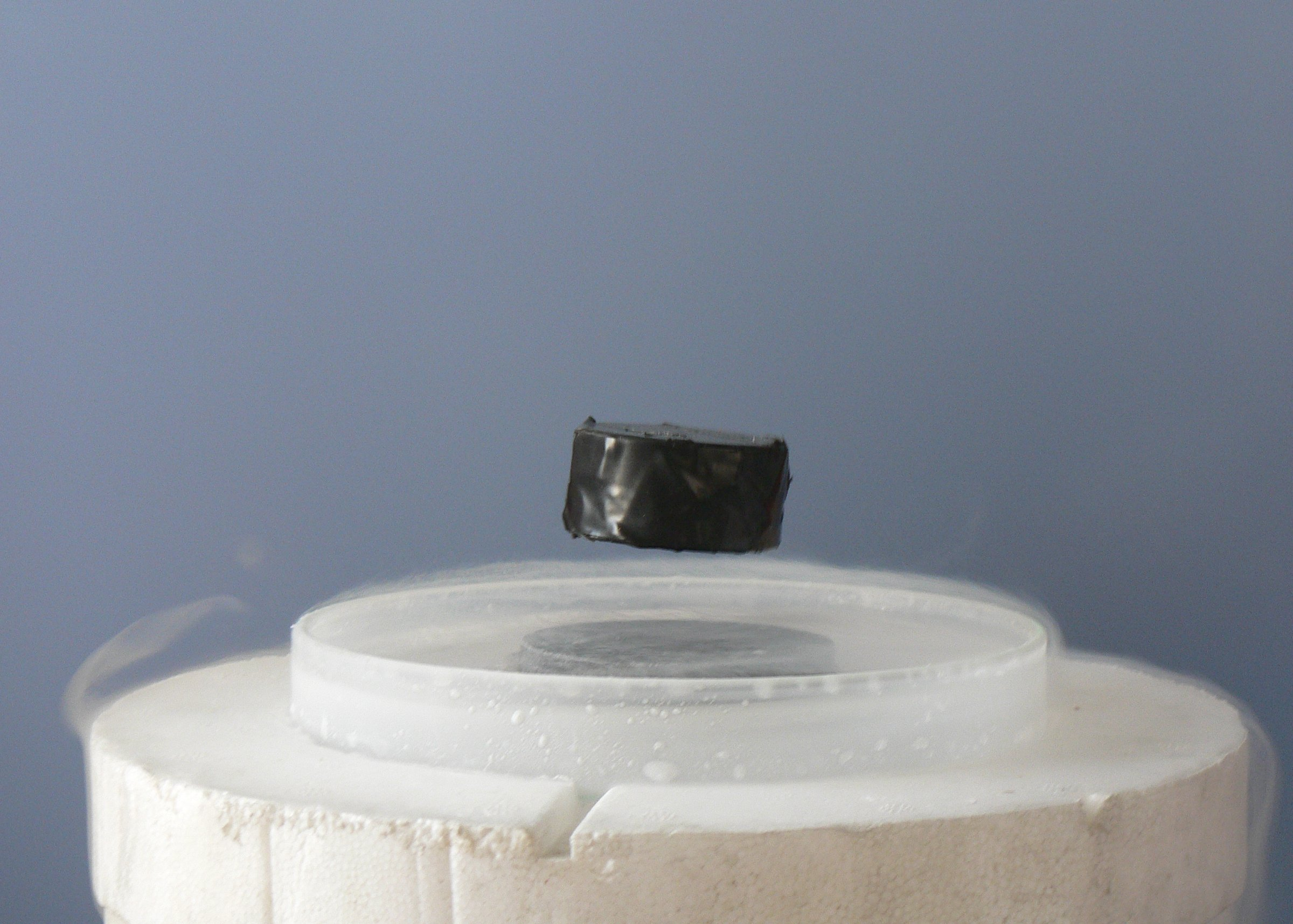
Small magnet levitating above a high-temperature superconductor cooled by liquid nitrogen: this is a case of Meissner effect.

An experiment based on flux quantization of a three-grain ring of YBa_{2}Cu_{3}O_{7} (YBCO) was proposed to test the symmetry of the order parameter in the HTS. The symmetry of the order parameter could best be probed at the junction interface as the Cooper pairs tunnel across a Josephson junction or weak link. It was expected that a half-integer flux, that is, a spontaneous magnetization could only occur for a junction of d symmetry superconductors. But, even if the junction experiment is the strongest method to determine the symmetry of the HTS order parameter, the results have been ambiguous. John R. Kirtley and C. C. Tsuei thought that the ambiguous results came from the defects inside the HTS, leading them to an experiment where both clean limit (no defects) and dirty limit (maximal defects) were considered simultaneously. Spontaneous magnetization was clearly observed in YBCO, which supported the d symmetry of the order parameter in YBCO. But, since YBCO is orthorhombic, it might inherently have an admixture of s symmetry. By tuning their technique, they found an admixture of s symmetry in YBCO within about 3%. Also, they found a pure d_{x^{2}−y^{2}} order parameter symmetry in tetragonal Tl_{2}Ba_{2}CuO_{6}.

=== Spin-fluctuation mechanism ===
The lack of exact theoretical computations on such strongly interacting electron systems has complicated attempts to validate spin-fluctuation. However, most theoretical calculations, including phenomenological and diagrammatic approaches, converge on magnetic fluctuations as the pairing mechanism.

==== Qualitative explanation ====
In a superconductor, the flow of electrons cannot be resolved into individual electrons, but instead consists of pairs of bound electrons, called Cooper pairs. In conventional superconductors, these pairs are formed when an electron moving through the material distorts the surrounding crystal lattice, which attracts another electron and forms a bound pair. This is sometimes called the "water bed" effect. Each Cooper pair requires a certain minimum energy to be displaced, and if the thermal fluctuations in the crystal lattice are smaller than this energy the pair can flow without dissipating energy. Electron flow without resistance is superconductivity.

In a high-T_{c} superconductor, the mechanism is extremely similar to a conventional superconductor, except that phonons play virtually no role, replaced by spin-density waves. Just as all known conventional superconductors are strong phonon systems, all known high-T_{c} superconductors are strong spin-density wave systems, within close vicinity of a magnetic transition to, for example, an antiferromagnet. When an electron moves in a high-T_{c} superconductor, its spin creates a spin-density wave around it. This spin-density wave in turn causes a nearby electron to fall into the spin depression created by the first electron (water-bed). When the system temperature is lowered, more spin density waves and Cooper pairs are created, eventually leading to superconductivity. High-T_{c} systems are magnetic systems due to the Coulomb interaction, creating a strong Coulomb repulsion between electrons. This repulsion prevents pairing of the Cooper pairs on the same lattice site. Instead, pairing occurs at near-neighbor lattice sites. This is the so-called d-wave pairing, where the pairing state has a node (zero) at the origin.

== Examples ==
Examples of high-T_{c} cuprate superconductors include YBCO and BSCCO, which are the most known materials that achieve superconductivity above the boiling point of liquid nitrogen.

Temperatures of most practical superconductors and coolants, at ordinary pressures
Transition temperature	Item	Material type
195 K (−78 °C)	Dry ice (Carbon dioxide) – sublimation	Coolant
184 K (−89 °C)	Lowest temperature recorded on Earth	Coolant
110 K (−163 °C)	BSCCO	Cuprate superconductors
93 K (−180.2 °C)	YBCO	Cuprate superconductors
77 K (−196.2 °C)	Nitrogen – Boiling	Coolant
55 K (−218.2 °C)	SmFeAs(O,F)	Iron-based superconductors
41 K (−232.2 °C)	CeFeAs(O,F)	Iron-based superconductors
26 K (−247.2 °C)	LaFeAs(O,F)	Iron-based superconductors
18 K (−255.2 °C)	Nb_{3}Sn	Metallic low-temperature superconductors
3K (−270 °C)	Helium – boiling	Coolant
3 K (−270.15 °C)	Hg (mercury: the first discovered superconductor)	Metallic low-temperature superconductors

== See also ==
- Flux pumping – Process to magnetize superconductors
- Macroscopic quantum phenomena – Macroscopic processes showing quantum behavior
- Mixed conduction
- SQUID – Type of magnetometer
- Superconducting wire – Wires exhibiting zero resistance
- Superconductor classification – Different types of superconductors
- Superstripes – Broken symmetry phase favoring onset of superconducting or superfluid order
- Technological applications of superconductivity
