= Lanthanum barium copper oxide =

High temperature superconductor

Identifiers
CAS Number	65107-47-3

Properties
Chemical formula	Ba_{0.15}CuLa_{1.85}O_{4}
Molar mass	405.116 g·mol^{−1}
Appearance	black solid
- Except where otherwise noted, data are given for materials in their standard state (at 25 °C [77 °F], 100 kPa). Infobox references

Lanthanum barium copper oxide, or LBCO, is an inorganic compound with the formula La_{1.85}Ba_{0.15}CuO_{4}. It is a black solid produced by heating an intimate mixture of barium oxide, copper(II) oxide, and lanthanum oxide in the presence of oxygen. The material was discovered in 1986 and was the first high temperature superconductor. Johannes Georg Bednorz and K. Alex Müller shared the 1987 Nobel Prize in physics for the discovery that this material exhibits superconductivity at the then unusually high temperature. This finding led to intense and fruitful efforts to generate other cuprate superconductors.

Lanthanum barium copper oxide is related to the far simpler compound lanthanum cuprate, which has a similar structure. In lanthanum barium copper oxide, some of the La(III) centers are replaced by Ba(II), which has a similar ionic radius. This Ba-for-La replacement causes removal of some electrons (hole doping) from the d-band associated with the sheets of copper oxide. As a function of such chemical doping, the system changes its ground state from Mott insulating to superconducting. Before reaching optimally doping (around x=0.16) the La_{2−x}Ba_{x}CuO_{4}, superconductivity is partially suppressed at the specific x=1/8 doping due to emergence of charge stripe order.
