= Dorthe =

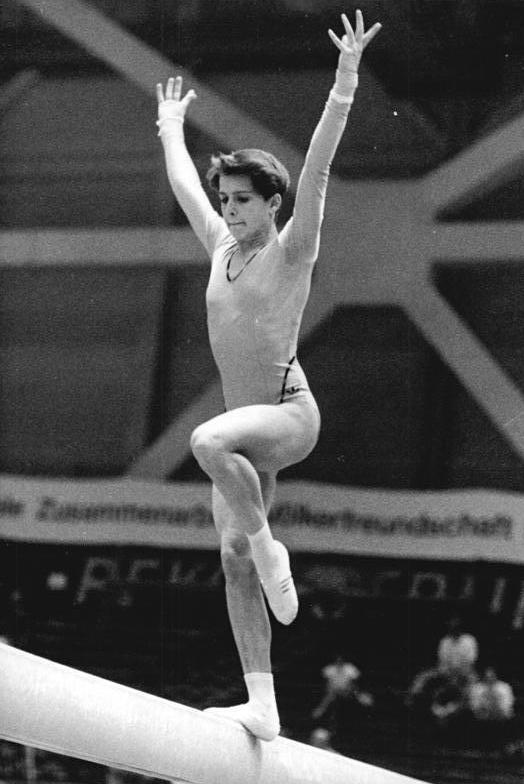
Dörte Thümmler

Dorthe is a given name. Notable people with the name include:

- Dorthe Binkert (born 1949), German novelist and non-fiction writer
- Dorthe Dahl-Jensen (born 1958), Danish palaeoclimatology professor and researcher
- Dorthe Engelbrechtsdatter (1634–1716), Norwegian author
- Dorthe Hansen, Danish orienteering competitor
- Dorthe Holm (born 1972), Danish curler from Kastrup
- Dorthe Hoppius (born 1996), German footballer
- Dorthe Jørgensen (born 1959), Danish philosopher, theologian, historian of ideas
- Dorthe Kristoffersen (1906–1976), Greenlandic artist
- Dorthe Larsen (born 1969), Danish football goalkeeper
- Anne Dorthe Lund (died 1759), Danish stage actress
- Dorthe Nors (born 1970), Danish writer
- Dorthe Pedersen (born 1977), Danish rower
- Dorthe Rasmussen (born 1960), long-distance runner from Denmark
- Dorthe Ravnsbæk, Danish chemist working in battery technology
- Dorthe Emilie Røssell (born 1934), Danish author
- Dorthe Skappel (born 1962), Norwegian television personality
- Anne Dorthe Tanderup (born 1972), Danish team handball player, Olympic champion, World Champion
- Dorthe Wolfsberg (born 1958), retired Danish sprinter

== See also ==
- Dorte (name)
- Castets-en-Dorthe, former commune in the Gironde department in Nouvelle-Aquitaine in southwestern France
- Dorothy (disambiguation)
- Dorothée
- Dorth
- Dourthe
- Dörth
