= Technological applications of superconductivity =

Superconductors function with almost no electrical resistance, making them useful for a variety of rapidly advancing technological applications. One common application is superconducting electromagnets, which utilize a series of superconducting coils to generate a magnetic field. Additionally, the electric power transmission system takes advantage of the low electrical resistance of superconductors to improve efficiency when transferring and storing electrical energy.

Technological applications of superconductivity include:

- powerful superconducting electromagnets used in maglev trains, magnetic resonance imaging (MRI) and nuclear magnetic resonance (NMR) machines, magnetic confinement fusion reactors (e.g. tokamaks), and the beam-steering and focusing magnets used in particle accelerators
- high sensitivity particle detectors, including the transition edge sensor, the superconducting bolometer, the superconducting tunnel junction detector, the kinetic inductance detector, and the superconducting nanowire single-photon detector
- electric motors and generators
- railgun and coilgun magnets
- fast fault current limiters
- low-loss power cables
- the production of sensitive magnetometers based on SQUIDs (superconducting quantum interference devices)
- fast digital circuits (including those based on Josephson junctions and rapid single flux quantum technology),
- RF and microwave filters (e.g., for mobile phone base stations, as well as military ultra-sensitive/selective receivers)

== Low-temperature superconductivity ==
=== Magnetic resonance imaging and nuclear magnetic resonance ===
The biggest application for superconductivity is in producing the large-volume, stable, and high-intensity magnetic fields required for magnetic resonance imaging (MRI) and nuclear magnetic resonance (NMR). This represents a multi-billion-US$ market for companies such as Oxford Instruments and Siemens. The magnets typically use low-temperature superconductors (LTS) because high-temperature superconductors are not yet cheap enough to cost-effectively deliver the high, stable, and large-volume fields required, notwithstanding the need to cool LTS instruments to liquid helium temperatures. Superconductors are also used in high field scientific magnets.

As of 2023, there are some cryogen-free MRI magnets that operate within a safe temperature range for an LTS instrument. Rather than using a cryogen, such as liquid helium or nitrogen, that must be continually replenished, this design utilizes a GM cryocooler, which is a closed system containing helium gas. Through a combination of insulation techniques and a series of cooling stages, the GM cryocooler keeps the magnet at low enough temperatures without the additional cost of refilling a traditional cryogen. The design of this magnet uses superconducting coils to generate an electromagnetic field, which can be used to capture images of the human body. However, unlike a typical MRI magnet, this design is unable to continue functioning as long as a typical cryogen-based MRI magnet in the event of a power outage.

=== Particle accelerators ===
Because of their low electrical resistance, superconductors are more efficient at producing electromagnetic fields than typical conductors, making them a cost-effective choice for use in physics research. In the first LTS particle accelerators, Nb-Ti was the preferred superconductor because of its ductility and ability to carry a considerable amount of electric current. However, future research is planned regarding the possibility of replacing Nb-Ti with niobium-tin, which is able to carry a greater current but is also more brittle. By overcoming the challenge of designing coils from a brittle material such as Nb-Ti, researchers may be able to develop a more efficient superconducting particle accelerator.

Particle accelerators such as the Large Hadron Collider can include many high field electromagnets requiring large quantities of LTS. To construct the LHC magnets required more than 28 percent of the world's niobium-titanium wire production for five years, with large quantities of NbTi also used in the magnets for the LHC's huge experiment detectors.

=== Magnetic fusion devices ===
During fusion processes, electromagnets can be used to contain plasma. Superconducting electromagnets produce stronger magnetic fields from a lower energy input than their traditional counterparts but also involve higher initial costs.

Conventional fusion machines (JET, ST-40, NTSX-U and MAST) use blocks of copper. This limits their fields to 1-3 Tesla. Several superconducting fusion machines are planned for the 2024-2026 timeframe. These include ITER, ARC and the next version of ST-40. The addition of high-temperature superconductors should yield an order of magnitude improvement in fields (10-13 tesla) for a new generation of Tokamaks.

The cable-in-conduit (CIC) design for superconductors is also commonly utilized for electromagnetic confinement. The CIC conductor is able to withstand large amounts of force, is efficient at transferring electrical current, and is a good insulator, making it well-suited for use in fusion processes.

=== Generators ===
Superconducting wires and electromagnetic fields generated from superconducting coils can be utilized in some generators. Superconducting versions of these elements are more efficient than their counterparts, allowing for greater electricity generation from a smaller and lighter generator. The superconducting coils in these generators are typically made from NbTi and are used to generate an electromagnetic field. Since NbTi is a LTS, liquid helium is typically used as a cryogen to keep the generator at a cool enough temperature. This type of superconducting generator has been applied to power offshore wind turbines since the design optimizes energy output from a relatively small and lightweight generator.

=== Superconducting electromagnet iron separator (SEIS) ===
In coal purification, electromagnets are employed to remove ferromagnetic substances, primarily iron, from coal. Superconductors are more energy-efficient than typical conductors, so they are used to create superconducting coils that generate an electromagnetic field. These LTS coils require cryogenic cooling from liquid helium to safely operate. These superconducting magnets require less energy input and take up a smaller volume than a typical magnet.

== High-temperature superconductivity ==
The commercial applications so far for high-temperature superconductors (HTS) have been limited by other properties of the materials discovered thus far. HTS require only liquid nitrogen, not liquid helium, to cool to superconducting temperatures. However, currently known high-temperature superconductors are brittle ceramics that are expensive to manufacture and not easily formed into wires or other useful shapes.

Although it is difficult to process high-temperature superconductors into wires, the process is relatively less challenging when they are in bulk form; consequently, applications for them in this form are beginning to emerge.

Therefore, the applications for HTS have been where it has some other intrinsic advantage, e.g. in:

- low thermal loss current leads for LTS devices (low thermal conductivity),
- SQUID,
- RF and microwave filters (low resistance to RF), and
- increasingly in specialist scientific magnets, particularly where size and electricity consumption are critical (while HTS wire is much more expensive than LTS in these applications, this can be offset by the relative cost and convenience of cooling); the ability to ramp field is desired (the higher and wider range of HTS's operating temperature means faster changes in field can be managed); or cryogen free operation is desired (LTS generally requires liquid helium, which is becoming more scarce and expensive).

=== HTS-based systems ===
HTS has application in scientific and industrial magnets, including use in NMR and MRI systems. Commercial systems are now available in each category.

Also one intrinsic attribute of HTS is that it can withstand much higher magnetic fields than LTS, so HTS at liquid helium temperatures are being explored for very high-field inserts inside LTS magnets.

Promising future industrial and commercial HTS applications include Induction heaters, transformers, fault current limiters, power storage, motors and generators, fusion reactors (see ITER) and magnetic levitation devices.

Early applications will be where the benefit of smaller size, lower weight or the ability to rapidly switch current (fault current limiters) outweighs the added cost. Longer-term as conductor price falls HTS systems should be competitive in a much wider range of applications on energy efficiency grounds alone. (For a relatively technical and US-centric view of state of play of HTS technology in power systems and the development status of Generation 2 conductor see Superconductivity for Electric Systems 2008 US DOE Annual Peer Review.)

=== Magnesium diboride ===
Magnesium diboride is a much cheaper superconductor than either BSCCO or YBCO in terms of cost per current-carrying capacity per length (cost/(kA*m)), in the same ballpark as LTS, and on this basis many manufactured wires are already cheaper than copper. Furthermore, MgB_{2} superconducts at temperatures higher than LTS (its critical temperature is 39 K, compared with less than 10 K for NbTi and 18.3 K for Nb_{3}Sn), introducing the possibility of using it at 10-20 K in cryogen-free magnets or perhaps eventually in liquid hydrogen. However MgB_{2} is limited in the magnetic field it can tolerate at these higher temperatures, so further research is required to demonstrate its competitiveness in higher field applications.

=== Trapped field magnets ===
Exposing superconducting materials to a brief magnetic field can trap the field for use in machines such as generators. In some applications they could replace traditional permanent magnets.

When a magnetic field is applied for a short duration to a bulk superconducting material, the material can trap that magnetic field internally; this property can be utilized in devices such as electric generators. Depending on the application, it can serve as an alternative to conventional permanent magnets.

Magnetized bulk high-temperature superconductors can function as quasi-permanent magnets and are capable of sustaining magnetic fields far stronger than those of rare-earth magnets, making them promising for applications such as nuclear magnetic resonance (NMR) spectroscopy.

== Electric power transmission ==
Both LTS and HTS can conduct electricity with virtually no electrical resistance, making them suitable for a variety of uses within the electricity distribution industry.

=== Superconducting cables ===
Because of their low electrical resistance, superconducting cables are more efficient at transferring electricity than a typical cable. Although HTS and LTS cables are initially more expensive than any of their traditional counterparts, the savings associated with lower losses of current make the prices more comparable in the long term. However, these high start-up costs still provide a challenge for cities considering making the transition to superconducting cables within the power grid.

=== Superconducting fault-current limiters (SCFCLs) ===
Fault currents occur when a failure at some point in the power grid causes an unusually large and potentially damaging current to flow through the grid. The ideal fault-current limiter (FCL) would be able to respond to a fault current by quickly transitioning to a state of low resistance and absorbing the extra current caused by the fault. An FCL would require some mechanism for detecting a fault to trigger it to switch “on” and then some way to return to a normal state after the fault current is contained. Because superconductors have a low electrical resistance, they are well suited for use in a potential FCL design. These SCFCL designs are still under development, but have the potential to provide greater safety to the electric grid if widely implemented.

=== Superconducting magnetic energy storage (SMES) ===
Again, this concept takes advantage of the low resistance of superconductors as a method for electricity storage. A SMES has the ability to repeatedly discharge its stored energy and then recover this energy, storing it again. In an SMES design, a superconducting coil generates an electromagnetic field, effectively storing electricity that can be discharged with virtually no loss of current due to resistance. SMES systems typically utilize LTS, meaning they require a refrigeration system. LTS, typically niobium titanium alloys, can operate in a higher magnetic field than HTS, making LTS more effective for SMES.

=== Historical Projects ===
The Holbrook Superconductor Project, also known as the LIPA project, was a project to design and build the world's first production superconducting transmission power cable. The cable was commissioned in late June 2008 by the Long Island Power Authority (LIPA) and was in operation for two years. The suburban Long Island electrical substation is fed by a 2,000 foot (600 m) underground cable system which consists of about 99 miles (159 km) of high-temperature superconductor wire manufactured by American Superconductor chilled to −371 °F (−223.9 °C; 49.3 K) with liquid nitrogen, greatly reducing the cost required to deliver additional power. In addition, the installation of the cable bypassed strict regulations for overhead power lines, and offered a solution for the public's concerns on overhead power lines.

The Tres Amigas Project was proposed in 2009 as an electrical HVDC interconnector between the Eastern Interconnection, the Western Interconnection and Texas Interconnection. It was proposed to be a multi-mile, triangular pathway of superconducting electric cables, capable of transferring five gigawatts of power between the three U.S. power grids. The project lapsed in 2015 when the Eastern Interconnect withdrew from the project. Construction was never begun.

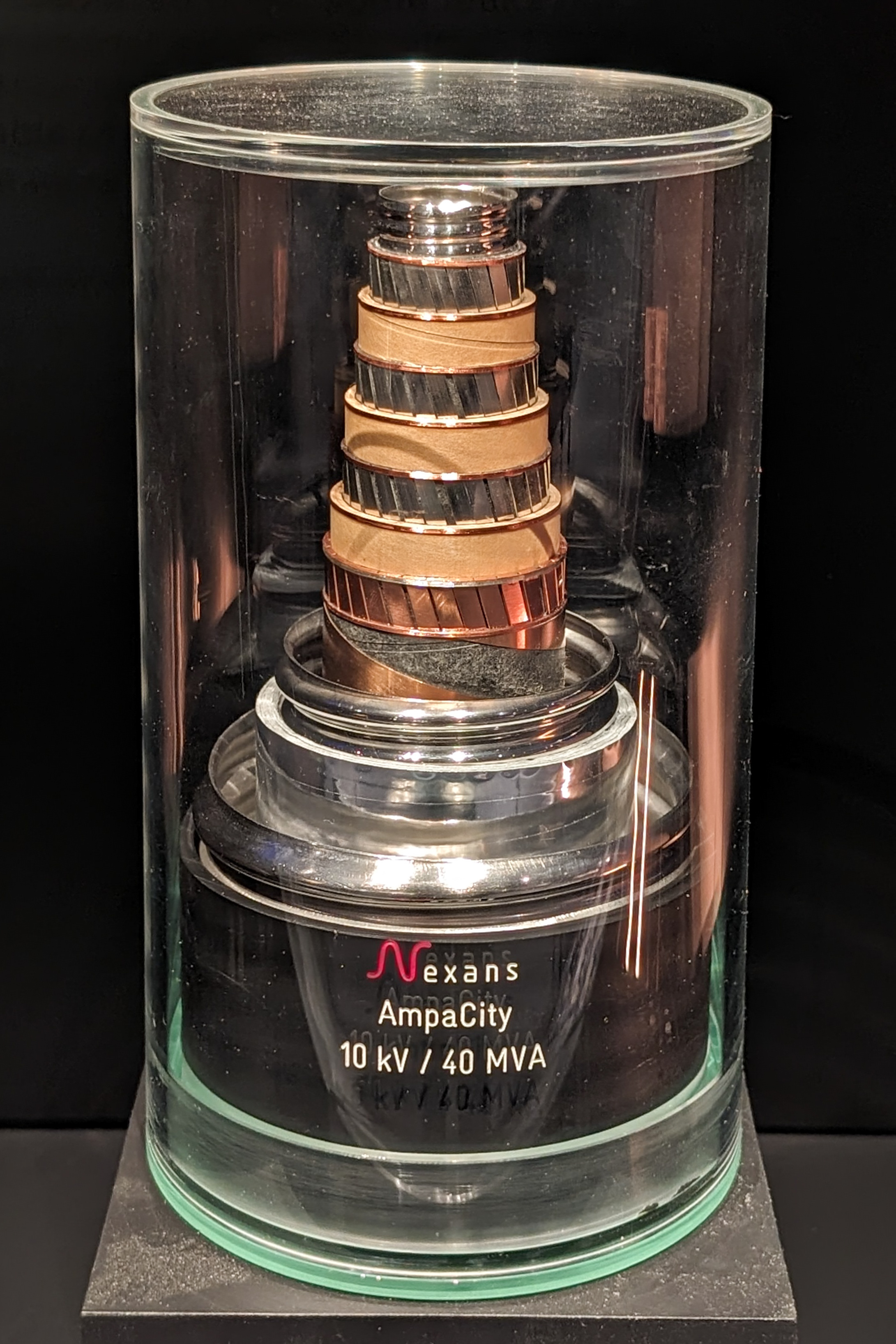
Section of superconducting cable, as installed in Essen, Germany

Essen, Germany has the world's longest superconducting power cable in production at 1 kilometer. It is a 10 kV liquid nitrogen cooled cable. The cable is smaller than an equivalent 110 kV regular cable and the lower voltage has the additional benefit of smaller transformers.

In 2020, an aluminium plant in Voerde, Germany, announced plans to use superconductors for cables carrying 200 kA, citing lower volume and material demand as advantages.
