= Niobium–germanium =

Intermetallic chemical compound

Niobium-germanium (Nb_{3}Ge) is an intermetallic chemical compound of niobium (Nb) and germanium (Ge). It has A15 phase structure.

It is a superconductor with a critical temperature of 23.2 K.

Sputtered films have been reported to have an upper critical field of 37 teslas at 4.2 K.

== History ==
Nb_{3}Ge was discovered to be a superconductor in 1973 and for 13 years (until the discovery in 1986 of the cuprate superconductors) it held the record as having the highest critical temperature.

It has not been as widely used for superconductive applications as niobium–tin or niobium–titanium.

== Related alloys ==
Niobium-germanium-aluminium has an upper critical field of about 10 teslas.
