= A15 phases =

Class of intermetallic compounds

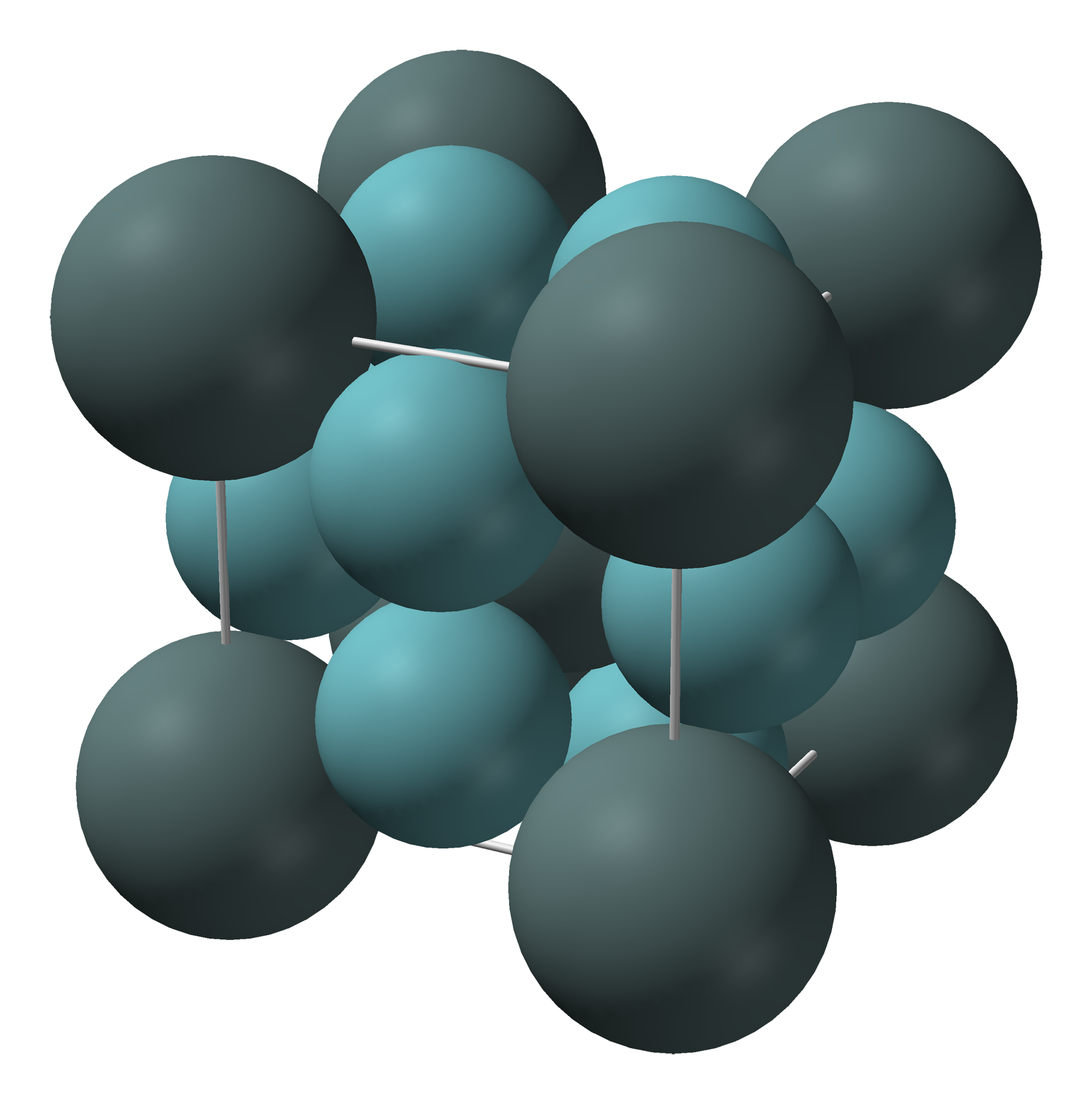
Unit cell of the A15 phases of Nb_{3}Sn

In metallurgy, the A15 phases (also known as β-W or Cr_{3}Si structure types) are series of intermetallic compounds with the chemical formula A_{3}B (where A is a transition metal and B can be any element) and a specific structure. The A15 phase is also one of the members in the Frank–Kasper phases family. Many of these compounds have superconductivity at around 20 K (−253 °C; −424 °F), which is comparatively high, and remain superconductive in magnetic fields of tens of teslas (hundreds of kilogauss). This kind of superconductivity (Type-II superconductivity) is an important area of study as it has several practical applications.

== History ==
The first time that A15 structure was observed was in 1931 when an electrolytically deposited layer of tungsten was examined. Discussion of whether the β-tungsten structure is an allotrope of tungsten or the structure of a tungsten suboxide was long-standing, but since the 1950s there has been many publications showing that the material is a true allotrope of tungsten.

The first intermetallic compound discovered with typical A_{3}B composition was chromium silicide Cr_{3}Si, discovered in 1933. Several other compounds with A15 structure were discovered in following years. No large interest existed in research on those compounds. This changed with the discovery that vanadium silicide V_{3}Si showed superconductivity at around 17 K in 1953. In following years, several other A_{3}B superconductors were found. Niobium-germanium held the record for the highest temperature of 23.2 K from 1973 until the discovery of the cuprate superconductors in 1986. It took time for the method to produce wires from the very brittle A15 phase materials to be established. This method is still complicated. Though some A15 phase materials can withstand higher magnetic field intensity and have higher critical temperatures than the NbZr and NbTi alloys, NbTi is still used for most applications due to easier manufacturing. Nb_{3}Sn is used for some high field applications, for example high-end MRI scanners and NMR spectrometers.

A relaxed form of the Voronoi diagram of the A15 phase seems to have the least surface area among all the possible partitions of three-dimensional Euclidean space in regions of equal volume. This partition, also known as the Weaire–Phelan structure, is often present in clathrate hydrates.

== Examples ==
- Vanadium-silicon
- Vanadium-gallium
- Niobium-germanium
- Niobium-tin
- Titanium-gold
- Tungsten (β-phase)

== See also ==
- Weaire–Phelan structure, for the space tessellation generated by A15 phases
