= Dorte (name) =

Dorte (and its variants Dorthe and Dort(h)ea) is a feminine given name which is mostly used in Denmark. The name is the Danish variant of Greek given name Dorothea and is a combination of the words gift and god. Its German variant is Dörte and its English version is Dorothy.

Notable people with the name are as follows:

== Dorte ==
=== First name ===
- Dorte Bennedsen (1938–2016), Danish theologian and politician
- Dorte Christensen, Danish cricket player
- Dorte Christiansen, Danish cricket player
- Dorte Dahlin (born 1955), Danish artist
- Dorte Ekner (born 1951), Danish tennis player
- Dorte Hammershøi, Danish academic
- Dorte Jensdatter (1672–1722), Danish murder victim
- Dorte Jensen (born 1972), Danish sailor
- Dorte Dalum Jensen (born 1978), Danish football player
- Dorte Juul Jensen (born 1957), Danish scientist
- Dorte Kjær (born 1964), Danish badminton player
- Dorte Lohse (born 1971), Danish road cyclist
- Dorte Mandrup (born 1961), Danish architect
- Dorte Olesen (born 1948), Danish mathematician
- Dorte Rasmussen (disambiguation)

=== Double name ===
- Ann-Dorte Christensen, Danish academic
- Anne Dorte Michelsen (born 1958), Danish musical artist
- Countess Anne Dorte of Rosenborg (1947–2014), Danish noble

== Dörte ==
- Dörte Gatermann (born 1956), German architect
- Dörte Haftendorn (born 1948), German mathematician
- Dörte Hansen (born 1964), German linguist, journalist and writer
- Dörte Helm, also Dorothea Helm, (1898–1941), German painter and graphic designer
- Dörte Liebetruth (born 1979), German politician
- Dörte Lindner (born 1974), German diver
- Dörte Stüdemann (born 1964), German volleyball player
- Dörte Thümmler (born 1971), German gymnast
- Dörte von Westernhagen (born 1943), German writer
- Dörte Clara Wolff (1907–1998), known as Dodo (painter), German painter and illustrator
