= Flux pumping =

Process to magnetize superconductors

Flux pumping is a method for magnetising superconductors to fields in excess of 15 teslas. The method can be applied to any type II superconductor and exploits a fundamental property of superconductors, namely their ability to support and maintain currents on the length scale of the superconductor. Conventional magnetic materials are magnetised on a molecular scale which means that superconductors can maintain a flux density orders of magnitude bigger than conventional materials. Flux pumping is especially significant when one bears in mind that all other methods of magnetising superconductors require application of a magnetic flux density at least as high as the final required field. This is not true of flux pumping.

An electric current flowing in a loop of superconducting wire can persist indefinitely with no power source. In a normal conductor, an electric current may be visualized as a fluid of electrons moving across a heavy ionic lattice. The electrons are constantly colliding with the ions in the lattice, and during each collision some of the energy carried by the current is absorbed by the lattice and converted into heat, which is essentially the vibrational kinetic energy of the lattice ions. As a result, the energy carried by the current is constantly being dissipated. This is the phenomenon of electrical resistance.

The situation is different in a superconductor. In a conventional superconductor, the electronic fluid cannot be resolved into individual electrons. Instead, it consists of bound pairs of electrons known as Cooper pairs. This pairing is caused by an attractive force between electrons from the exchange of phonons. Due to quantum mechanics, the energy spectrum of this Cooper pair fluid possesses an energy gap, meaning there is a minimum amount of energy ΔE that must be supplied in order to excite the fluid. Therefore, if ΔE is larger than the thermal energy of the lattice, given by kT, where k is the Boltzmann constant and T is the temperature, the fluid will not be scattered by the lattice. The Cooper pair fluid is thus a superfluid, meaning it can flow without energy dissipation.

In a class of superconductors known as type II superconductors, including all known high-temperature superconductors, an extremely small amount of resistivity appears at temperatures not too far below the nominal superconducting transition when an electric current is applied in conjunction with a strong magnetic field, which may be caused by the electric current. This is due to the motion of vortices in the electronic superfluid, which dissipates some of the energy carried by the current. If the current is sufficiently small, then the vortices are stationary, and the resistivity vanishes. The resistance due to this effect is tiny compared with that of non-superconducting materials, but must be taken into account in sensitive experiments.

== Introduction ==
In the method described here a magnetic field is swept across the superconductor in a magnetic wave. This field induces current according to Faraday's law of induction. As long as the direction of motion of the magnetic wave is constant then the current induced will always be in the same sense and successive waves will induce more and more current.

Traditionally the magnetic wave would be generated either by physically moving a magnet or by an arrangement of coils switched in sequence, such as occurs on the stator of a three-phase motor. Flux Pumping is a solid state method where a material which changes magnetic state at a suitable magnetic ordering temperature is heated at its edge and the resultant thermal wave produces a magnetic wave which then magnetizes the superconductor. A superconducting flux pump should not be confused with a classical flux pump as described in Van Klundert et al.’s review.

The method described here has two unique features:

- At no point is the superconductor driven normal; the procedure simply makes modifications to the critical state.
- The critical state is not modified by a moving magnet or an array of solenoids, but by a thermal pulse which modifies the magnetization, thus sweeping vortices into the material.

The system, as described, is actually a novel kind of heat engine in which thermal energy is being converted into magnetic energy.

== Background ==
=== Meissner effect ===
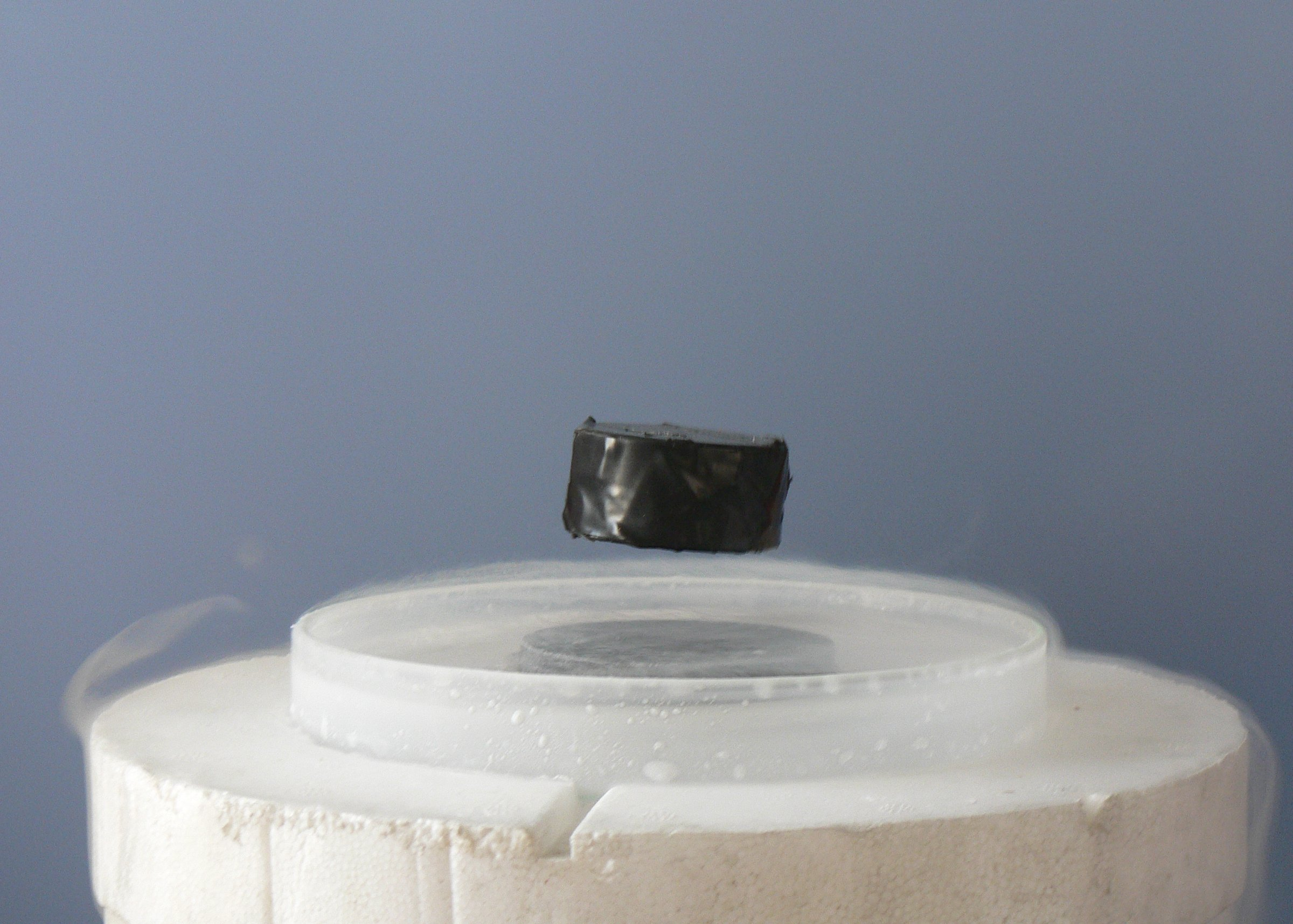
Persistent electric current flows on the surface of the superconductor, acting to exclude the magnetic field of the magnet. This current effectively forms an electromagnet that repels the magnet.

When a superconductor is placed in a weak external magnetic field H, the field penetrates the superconductor only a small distance λ, called the London penetration depth, decaying exponentially to zero within the interior of the material. This is called the Meissner effect, and is a defining characteristic of superconductivity. For most superconductors, the London penetration depth is on the order of 100 nm.

The Meissner effect is sometimes confused with the kind of diamagnetism one would expect in a perfect electrical conductor: according to Lenz's law, when a changing magnetic field is applied to a conductor, it will induce an electric current in the conductor that creates an opposing magnetic field. In a perfect conductor, an arbitrarily large current can be induced, and the resulting magnetic field exactly cancels the applied field.

The Meissner effect is distinct from this because a superconductor expels all magnetic fields, not just those that are changing. Suppose we have a material in its normal state, containing a constant internal magnetic field. When the material is cooled below the critical temperature, we would observe the abrupt expulsion of the internal magnetic field, which we would not expect based on Lenz's law.

The Meissner effect was explained by the brothers Fritz and Heinz London, who showed that the electromagnetic free energy in a superconductor is minimized provided

$$\nabla^2\mathbf{H} = \lambda^{-2} \mathbf{H}\,$$

where H is the magnetic field and λ is the London penetration depth.

This equation, which is known as the London equation, predicts that the magnetic field in a superconductor decays exponentially from whatever value it possesses at the surface.

In 1962, the first commercial superconducting wire, a niobium-titanium alloy, was developed by researchers at Westinghouse, allowing the construction of the first practical superconducting magnets. In the same year, Josephson made the important theoretical prediction that a supercurrent can flow between two pieces of superconductor separated by a thin layer of insulator. This phenomenon, now called the Josephson effect, is exploited by superconducting devices such as SQUIDs. It is used in the most accurate available measurements of the magnetic flux quantum $\Phi_0 = \frac{h}{2e}$, and thus (coupled with the quantum Hall resistivity) for the Planck constant h. Josephson was awarded the Nobel Prize for this work in 1973.

=== E–J power law ===
The most popular model used to describe superconductivity include Bean's critical state model and variations such as the Kim–Anderson model. However, the Bean model assumes zero resistivity and that current is always induced at the critical current. A more useful model for engineering applications is the so-called E–J power law, in which the field and the current are linked by the following equations:

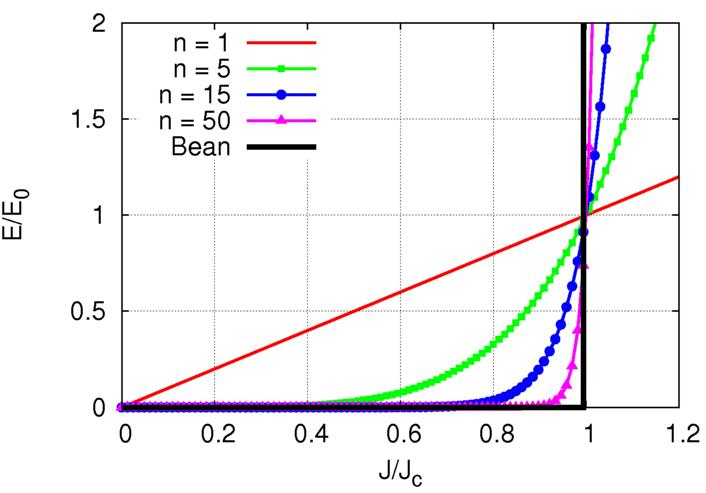

$$\rho = \frac{E}{J}\,$$

$$\mathbf{E} = \mathbf{E_0} * \left(\frac{J}{J_c}\right)^n\,$$

$$\rho(J) = \frac{E_0 * (\frac{J}{J_c})^{n-1}}{J_c} \,$$

In these equations, if n = 1 then the conductor has linear resistivity such as is found in copper. The higher the n-value the closer we get to the critical state model. Also the higher the n-value then the "better" the superconductor as the lower the resistivity at a certain current. The E–J power law can be used to describe the phenomenon of flux-creep in which a superconductor gradually loses its magnetisation over time. This process is logarithmic and thus gets slower and slower and ultimately leads to very stable fields.

== Theory ==
The potential of superconducting coils and bulk melt-processed YBCO single domains to maintain significant magnetic fields at cryogenic temperatures makes them particularly attractive for a variety of engineering applications including superconducting magnets, magnetic bearings and motors. It has already been shown that large fields can be obtained in single domain bulk samples at 77 K. A range of possible applications exist in the design of high power density electric motors.

Before such devices can be created a major problem needs to be overcome. Even though all of these devices use a superconductor in the role of a permanent magnet and even though the superconductor can trap potentially huge magnetic fields (greater than 10 T) the problem is the induction of the magnetic fields, this applies both to bulk and to coils operating in persistent mode. There are four possible known methods:

1. Cooling in field;
2. Zero field cooling, followed by slowly applied field;
3. Pulse magnetization;
4. Flux pumping;

Any of these methods could be used to magnetise the superconductor and this may be done either in situ or ex situ. Ideally the superconductors are magnetised in situ.

There are several reasons for this: first, if the superconductors should become demagnetised through (i) flux creep, (ii) repeatedly applied perpendicular fields or (iii) by loss of cooling then they may be re-magnetized without the need to disassemble the machine. Secondly, there are difficulties with handling very strongly magnetized material at cryogenic temperatures when assembling the machine. Thirdly, ex situ methods would require the machine to be assembled both cold and pre-magnetized and would offer significant design difficulties. Until room temperature superconductors can be prepared, the most efficient design of machine will therefore be one in which an in situ magnetizing fixture is included.

The first three methods all require a solenoid which can be switched on and off. In the first method an applied magnetic field is required equal to the required magnetic field, whilst the second and third approaches require fields at least two times greater. The final method, however, offers significant advantages since it achieves the final required field by repeated applications of a small field and can utilise a permanent magnet.

If we wish to pulse a field using, say, a 10 T magnet to magnetize a 30 mm × 10 mm sample then we can work out how big the solenoid needs to be. If it were possible to wind an appropriate coil using YBCO tape then, assuming an I^{c} of 70 A and a thickness of 100 μm, we would have 100 turns and 7 000 A turns. This would produce a B field of approximately 7 000/(20 × 10^{−3}) × 4π × 10^{−7} = 0.4 T. To produce 10 T would require pulsing to 1 400 A! An alternative calculation would be to assume a J_{c} of say 5 × 10^{8}Am^{−1} and a coil 1 cm^{2} in cross section. The field would then be 5 × 10^{8} × 10^{−2} × (2 × 4π × 10^{−7}) = 10 T. Clearly if the magnetisation fixture is not to occupy more room than the puck itself then a very high activation current would be required and either constraint makes in situ magnetization a very difficult proposition. What is required for in situ magnetisation is a magnetisation method in which a relatively small field of the order of milliteslas repeatedly applied is used to magnetize the superconductor.

== Applications ==
Superconducting magnets are some of the most powerful electromagnets known. They are used in MRI and NMR machines, mass spectrometers, Magnetohydrodynamic Power Generation and beam-steering magnets used in particle accelerators. They can also be used for magnetic separation, where weakly magnetic particles are extracted from a background of less or non-magnetic particles, as in the pigment industries.

Other early markets are arising where the relative efficiency, size and weight advantages of devices based on HTS outweigh the additional costs involved.

Promising future applications include high-performance transformers, power storage devices, electric power transmission, electric motors (e.g. for vehicle propulsion, as in vactrains or maglev trains), magnetic levitation devices, and fault current limiters.

== Sources ==
- Coombs, Timothy (2008). "Superconductors the next generation of permanent magnets". Archived from the original on July 29, 2024.
- Qiuliang Wang et al., "Study of Full-wave Superconducting Rectifier-type Flux-pumps", IEEE Transactions on Magnetics, vol. 32, No. 4, pp. 2699–2702, Jul. 1996.
- Coombs, Timothy (2007). "A novel heat engine for magnetising superconductors" (PDF).
- Coombs, Timothy; Hong, Z; Zhu, X (2007). "A thermally actuated superconducting flux pump". Physica C: Superconductivity. 468 (3): 153. Bibcode:2008PhyC..468..153C. doi:10.1016/j.physc.2007.11.003.
- L.J.M. van de Klundert et al., "On fully conducting rectifiers and fluxpumps. A review. Part 2: Commutation modes, characteristics and switches", Cryogenics, pp. 267–277, May 1981.
- L.J.M. van de Klundert et al., "Fully superconducting rectifiers and fluxpumps Part 1: Realized methods for pumping flux", Cryogenics, pp. 195–206, Apr. 1981.
- Kleinert, Hagen, Gauge Fields in Condensed Matter, Vol. I, " SUPERFLOW AND VORTEX LINES"; Disorder Fields, Phase Transitions, pp. 1–742, World Scientific (Singapore, 1989); Paperback ISBN 9971-5-0210-0 (also readable online: Vol. I)
- Larkin, Anatoly; Varlamov, Andrei, Theory of Fluctuations in Superconductors, Oxford University Press, Oxford, United Kingdom, 2005 (ISBN 0-19-852815-9)
- A.G. Lebed, ed. (2008). The Physics of Organic Superconductors and Conductors (1st ed.). Springer Series in Materials Science, Vol. 110. ISBN 9783540766728.
- Tinkham, Michael (2004). Introduction to Superconductivity (2nd ed.). Dover Books on Physics. ISBN 0-486-43503-2.
- Tipler, Paul; Llewellyn, Ralph (2002). Modern Physics (4th ed.). W. H. Freeman. ISBN 0-7167-4345-0.
