= AMSC =

AMSC may refer to:

- Army Management Staff College, a school at Fort Leavenworth
- Army Medical Service Corps (United States)
- American Mobile Satellite Corporation
- American Superconductor, an energy technologies company based in Devens, Massachusetts
