= Kenneth Sandhage =

Kenneth H. Sandhage is an American engineer.

Sandhage studied metallurgical engineering at Purdue University, completing his degree in 1981. He pursued a doctoral degree in ceramics at the Massachusetts Institute of Technology. Upon completing his doctorate in 1986, Sandhage began working for Corning Glass Works as a senior scientist. In 1988, he moved to an equivalently titled role at the American Superconductor Corporation. Sandhage began his teaching career in 1991 as an assistant professor at Ohio State University. He was promoted to associate professor in 1995 and became a full professor in 2000. Sandhage joined the faculty of the Georgia Institute of Technology in 2003. Two years later, he was appointed to a B. Mifflin Hood Professorship. In 2015, Sandgage was named to a Reilly Professorship in Materials Engineering at Purdue.
