= Binkert =

Binkert is a surname. Notable people with the surname include:

- Dörthe Binkert (born 1949), German novelist and non-fiction writer
- Herbert Binkert (1923–2020), German footballer
- Hermann Binkert (born 1964), German politician and jurist
