= Toroidal Fusion Core Experiment =

Fusion-energy-related US design study

The Toroidal Fusion Core Experiment (TFCX) was a US design study for a tokamak fusion experiment in the mid-1980s.

It was intended to achieve ignition using long burns of over 100 seconds. It could have used superconducting coils to create a 10 tesla magnetic field. Designed for an nt ~ 3 × 10^{20} and ion energy ~ 10-20keV, it was never built.
