= Foldback =

Foldback may refer to:

- Foldback (power supply design), a current-limiting device in power amplifiers
- Foldback (sound engineering), a speaker used to direct sound to performers
