= Vanadium–gallium =

Superconducting alloy

Vanadium–gallium (V_{3}Ga) is a superconducting alloy of vanadium and gallium. It is often used for the high field insert coils of superconducting electromagnets.

Vanadium–gallium tape is used in the highest field magnets (magnetic fields of 17.5 T). The structure of the superconducting A15 phase of V_{3}Ga is similar to that of the more common Nb_{3}Sn.

In conditions where the magnetic field is higher than 8 T and the temperature is higher than 4.2 K, Nb_{3}Sn and V_{3}Ga see use.

The main property of V_{3}Ga that makes it so useful is that it can be used in magnetic fields up to about 18 T, while Nb_{3}Sn can only be used in fields up to about 15 T.

The high field characteristics can be improved by doping with high-Z elements such as Nb, Ta, Sn, Pt and Pb.

== Properties ==
V_{3}Ga has an A15 phase, which makes it extremely brittle. One must be extremely cautious not to over-bend the wire when handling it.

Physical properties
Molecular weight	222.55 g/mol
Melting point	1720 °C
Highest magnetic field	18 T

Superconducting properties
Critical temperature (T_{c})	~14.2 K
Upper critical field (H_{c2})	over 19 T

== Fabrication of superconductive wires or tapes ==
V_{3}Ga wires can be formed using solid-state precipitation.

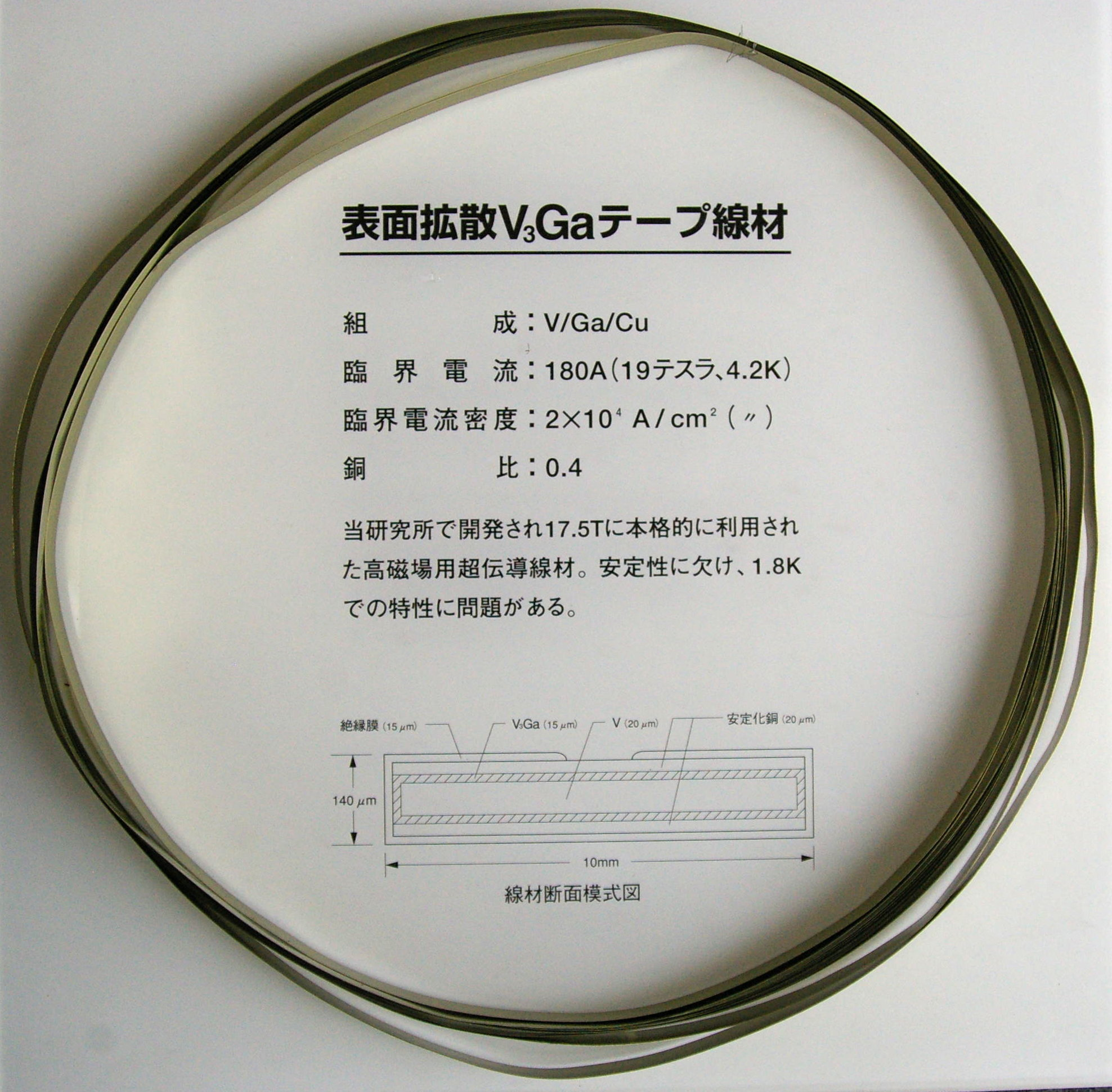
V_{3}Ga superconducting tape (10 mm × 0.14 mm cross section). A vanadium core is covered with 15 μm V_{3}Ga layer, then 20 μm bronze (stabilizing layer) and 15 μm insulating layer. Critical current 180 A (19.2 T, 4.2 K), critical current density 20 kA/cm^{2}.

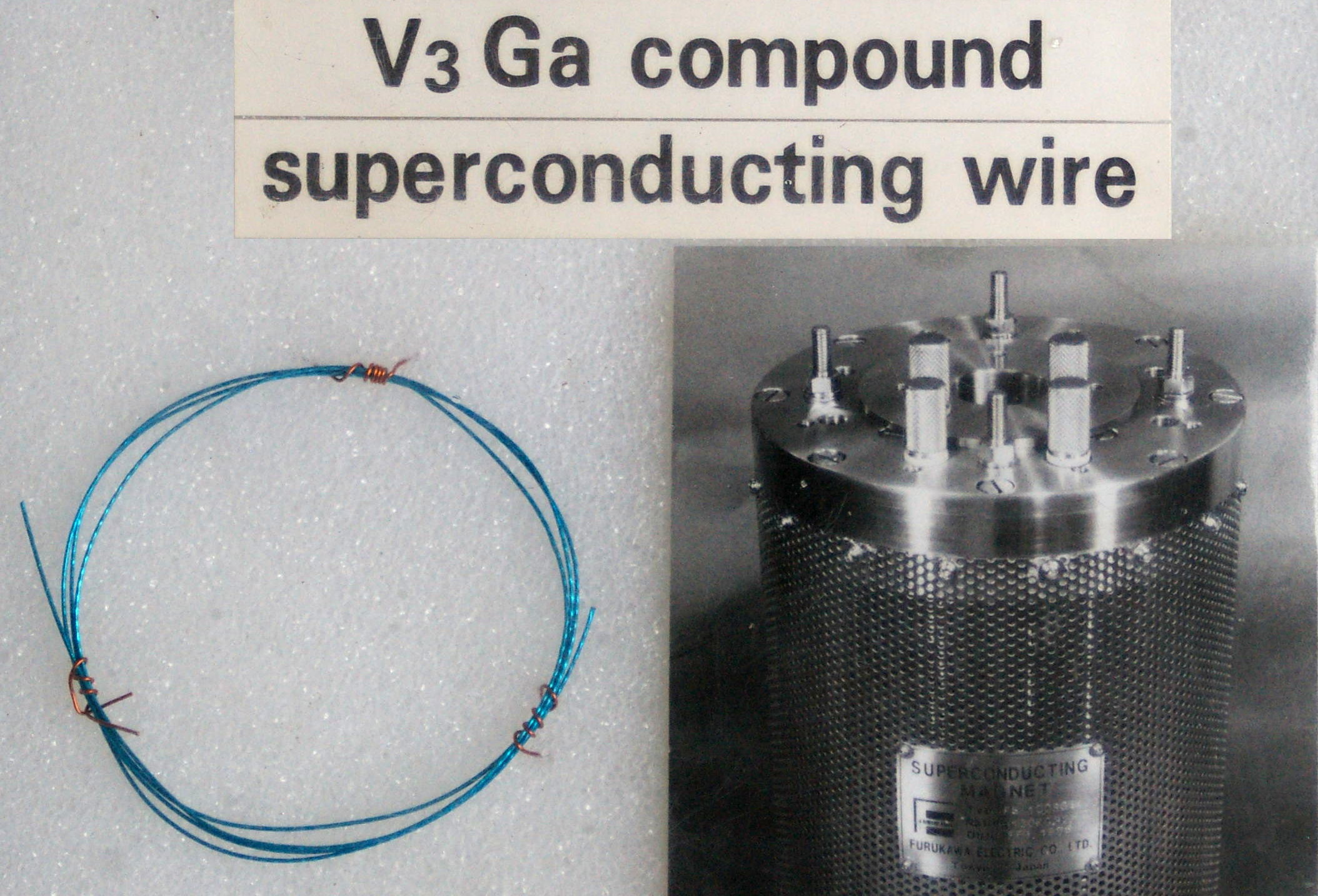
An example of a wire (V_{3}Ga alloy) used in a superconducting magnet.
