= Yet-Ming Chiang =

American materials scientist

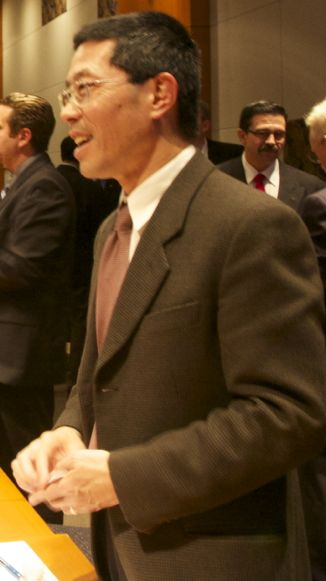
- Yet-Ming Chiang at the NTSB's Lithium Ion Batteries in Transportation forum
- Born: April 25, 1958; Taiwan
- Education: MIT
- Scientific career
- Institutions: MIT
- Doctoral advisor: W. David Kingery

Yet-Ming Chiang (born April 25, 1958) is a Taiwanese-American materials scientist and engineer, who is currently the Kyocera Professor at Massachusetts Institute of Technology. He has been influential in the development of new materials for energy storage, transfer, and power of a variety of different devices and vehicles.

Chiang was elected a member of the National Academy of Engineering in 2009 for contributions to the understanding of new energy storage materials and their commercialization.

== Background and career ==
Chiang was born in Taiwan, in 1958, and emigrated to the United States in 1964. He grew up in Brooklyn before moving to New Jersey and later Connecticut. His SB and Sc.D. degrees, 1980 and 1985 respectively, are both from MIT. He worked under the direction of W. David Kingery. His early work was centered around battery technology. Around 2010, Chiang shifted his research focus to climate technology and decarbonization.

He is the author of over 200 peer-reviewed publications and holds over 30 patents.

Chiang was the postdoctoral advisor for L'Oreal Awardee, Dorthe Ravnsbæk.

=== Entrepreneurship ===
Chiang has founded or provides expert consultation to a number of companies in the materials and energy storage spaces, including:

- Propel Aero - sodium fuel cell startup
- 24M - Cambridge, Massachusetts startup investigating battery technology for planes and other aircraft
- A123 Systems - automotive lithium-ion battery maker, based out of Hangzhou, China and Livonia, Michigan. Acquired by Wanxiang in 2012
- American Superconductor - superconducting materials
- Desktop Metal - 3D printing of metal components
- Form Energy - Iron-Air battery for long duration energy storage
- SpringLeaf Therapeutics - wearable biotechnology
- Sublime Systems - low carbon cement
- Propel Aero - electric aircraft engines
- Rock Zero - hardrock lithium refining

== Awards ==
- 2009 - Elected to U.S. National Academy of Engineering
- 2006 - R&D 100 Award
- 2001 - Ross Coffin Purdy Award of the Ceramics Society
- Fellow of the American Ceramic Society
