= Holbrook Superconductor Project =

Superconducting transmission power cable

Holbrook Superconductor

Location
- Country: United States
- State: New York

Ownership information
- Owner: Long Island Power Authority
- Operator: PSEG Long Island

Construction information
- Construction started: July 4, 2006
- Commissioned: June 25, 2008

Technical information
- Type: Superconductor transmission line

The Holbrook Superconductor Project is the world's first production superconducting transmission power cable. The lines were commissioned in 2008. The suburban Long Island electrical substation is fed by a 2,000-foot (610 m) tunnel containing approximately 509,000 feet (155,000 m) of high-temperature superconductor wire manufactured by American Superconductor, installed underground and chilled to superconducting temperature with liquid nitrogen.

== Project ==
The project was funded by the United States Department of Energy, and operates as part of the Long Island Power Authority (LIPA) power grid. The project team comprised American Superconductor, Nexans, Air Liquide and LIPA. It broke ground on July 4, 2006, was first energized April 22, 2008, and was commissioned on June 25, 2008. Between commissioning and March 2009 refrigeration events impacted normal operation.

== Specifications ==
The superconductor is bismuth strontium calcium copper oxide (BSCCO) which superconducts at liquid nitrogen temperatures(nitrogen is a liquid between −210 °C (−346 °F; 63 K) and −196 °C (−321 °F; 77 K)). Other parts of the system include a 13,000 U.S. gallons (49,000 L) liquid nitrogen storage tank, a Brayton cycle Helium refrigerator, and a number of cryostats which manage the transition between cryogenic and ambient temperatures. The system capacity is 574 MVA with an operating voltage of 138 kV at a maximum current of 2400 A.

== See also ==
- Technological applications of superconductivity
