= Dorte Rasmussen =

Dorte Rasmussen may refer to:

- Dorte Lohse (born 1971), Danish cyclist
- Dorthe Rasmussen (born 1960), Danish distance runner
