= Dourthe =

Dourthe is a surname. Notable people with the surname include:

- Mathieu Dourthe (born 1977), French rugby union player
- Richard Dourthe (born 1974), French rugby union player
