= Trichromium silicide =

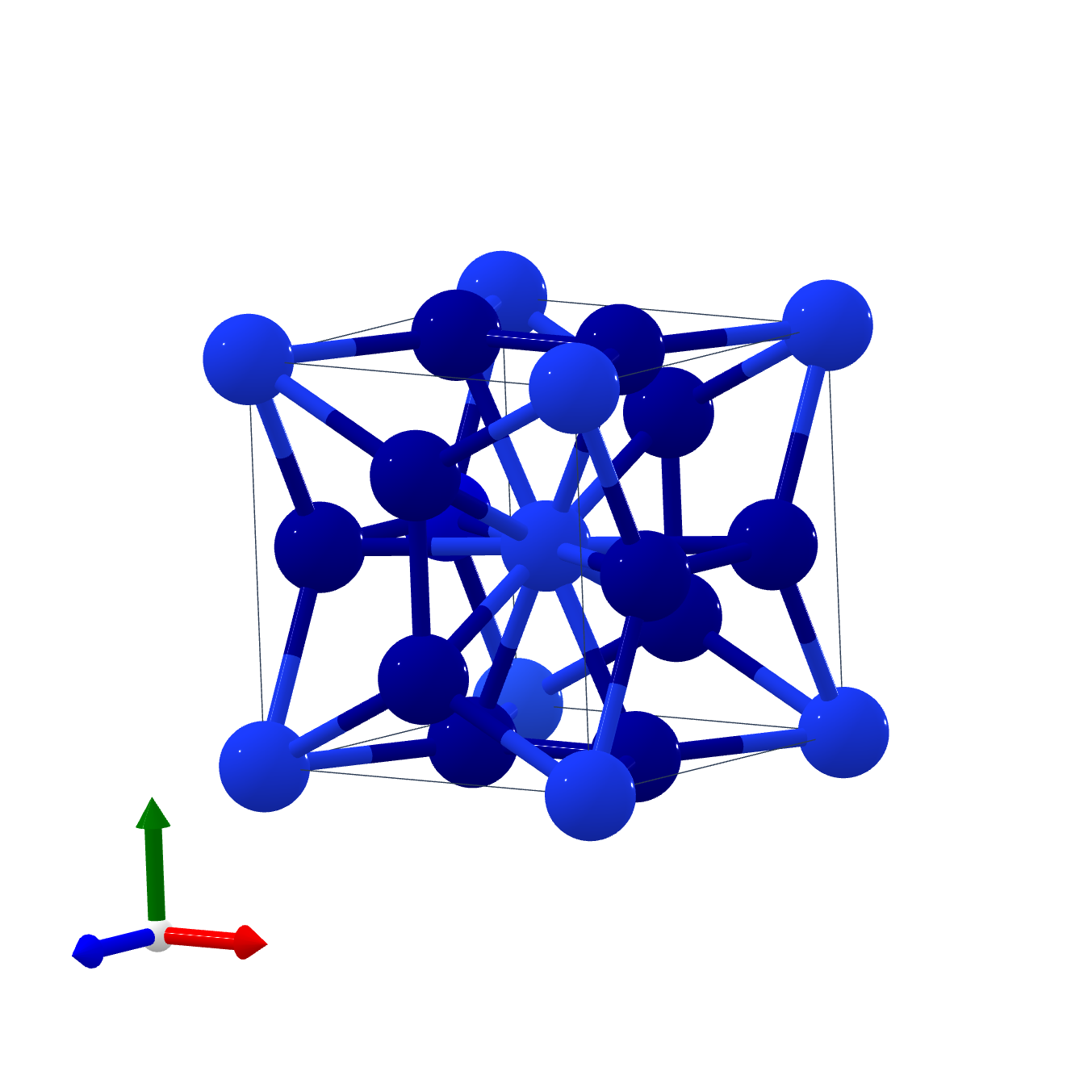
- Unit cell (Cr: deep blue; Si: light blue)

Identifiers
CAS Number	12018-36-9
3D model (JSmol)	Interactive image
ChemSpider	4891693
EC Number	234-639-3234-639-3
PubChem CID	6336547
- InChI: InChI=1S/3Cr.Si Key: ITRGGKFLQODYDH-UHFFFAOYSA-N
- SMILES: [Si].[Cr].[Cr].[Cr]

Properties
Chemical formula	Cr_{3}Si
Molar mass	184.073 g·mol^{−1}
Odor	odorless
Density	6.4 g/cm^{3}
Melting point	1,770 °C (3,220 °F; 2,040 K)
Solubility in water	insoluble

Structure
Crystal structure	Cubic, cP8
Space group	Pm3̅n, No. 223
Lattice constant	a = 0.4556 nm
Formula units (Z)	2
- Except where otherwise noted, data are given for materials in their standard state (at 25 °C [77 °F], 100 kPa). Infobox references

Trichromium silicide is an inorganic compound of chromium and silicon with the chemical formula Cr_{3}Si.
