= Dorthe Jørgensen =

Danish philosopher, educator and writer

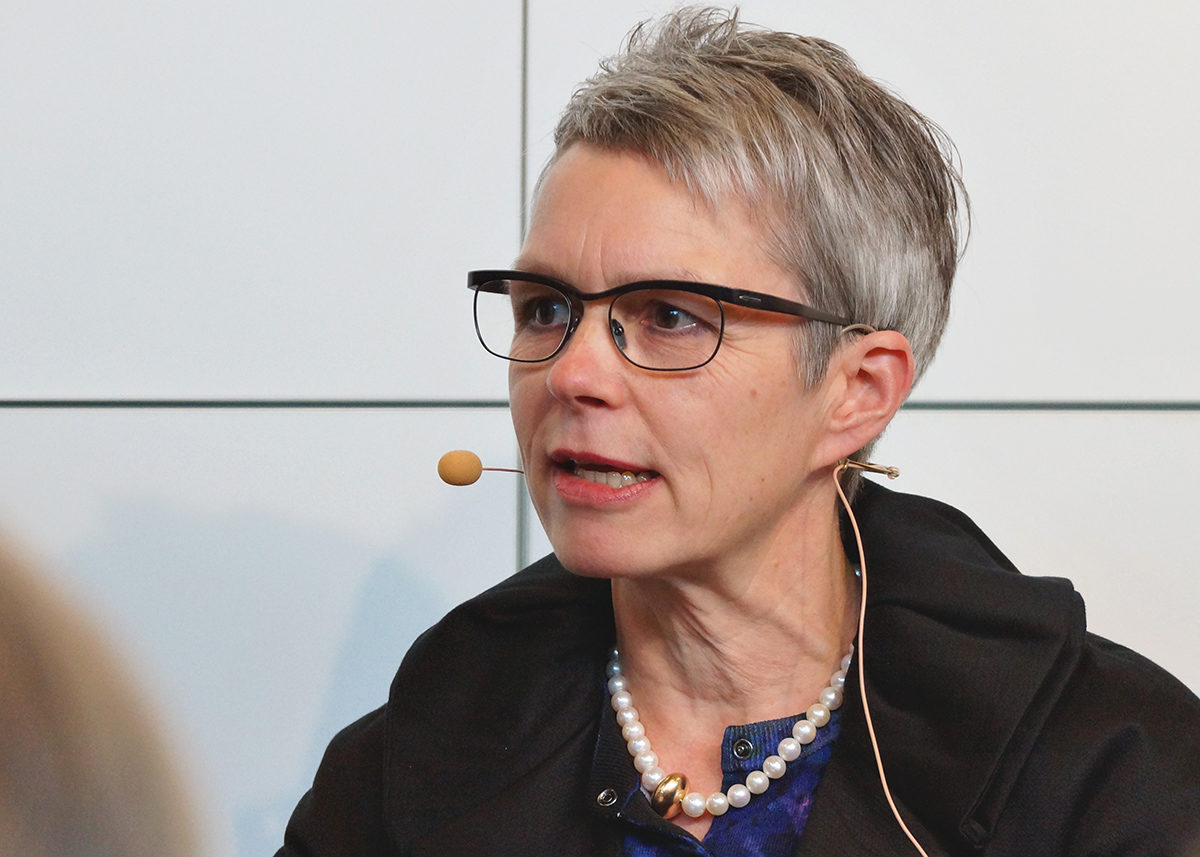
Dorthe Jørgensen

Dorthe Jørgensen (born 1959) is a Danish philosopher, theologian, and historian of ideas. In 2006, she became the first Danish woman to be awarded the honorary higher doctoral degree dr.phil.habil., in recognition of several successful publications. Since 2010, she has been Professor of Philosophy and the History of Ideas at Aarhus University.

== Early life, education, and marriage ==
Jørgensen grew up on a small dairy farm in Blegind near Hørning in Jutland. While her father attended to the livestock, her mother worked as a schoolteacher. She and her siblings had a pleasant childhood, based on old-fashioned farming traditions until her father died when only 49, suffering from changes in Danish agricultural practice.

She enjoyed school, especially writing essays, and dreamt of becoming an author while in the third grade at high school. After matriculating from Skanderborg Amtsgymnasium in 1978, she began studying Literature at Aarhus University, extending her interest to the History of Ideas, graduating in each in 1982 and 1983 respectively. After spending 18 months studying philosophy at the Freie Universität Berlin, in 1988 she earned an M.A. in History of Ideas with a dissertation on the German Jewish philosopher Walter Benjamin: Nær og fjern: Spor af en erfaringsontologi hos Walter Benjamin, published in 1990.

In 1991, Jørgensen spent a year as a visiting scholar in the English Department at Columbia University before returning to Aarhus where she received a Ph.D. in History of Ideas in 1995 with a thesis on G.W.F. Hegel: Aber die Wärme des Bluts: Et studium i den romantisk-moderne dialektik imellem vilje til Form og erfaring af faktisk fragmentering. I anledning af G.W.F. Hegels fortrængning af modernitetserfaringen.

In 1994, Jørgensen met Willy Aastrup (born 1948), who in 1997-2012 established and directed the Educational Counselling and Support Centre (RSC) at Aarhus University. They married 4 July, 2008, but lived together from 1994 till his death in 2019. During their 24½ years as a couple, Jørgensen's spouse read everything she wrote. She has expressed her gratitude to him in her books, four of which are also dedicated to him (Viden and visdom: Spørgsmålet om de intellektuelle, Den skønne tænkning: Veje til erfaringsmetafysik. Religionsfilosofisk udmøntet, Poetic Inclinations: Ethics, History, Philosophy, and Imaginative Moods: Aesthetics, Religion, Philosophy).

== Career ==
In 1995-1998, Jørgensen was assistant professor at Aarhus University, and in 1998, she received a tenured post thanks to her general background in philosophy and the history of ideas as well as extensive qualifications in aesthetics, metaphysics and modernity theory. In 2003, she received the Aarhus University Jubilee Foundation's Research Award and in 2006 she was awarded the honorary higher doctoral degree dr.phil.habil. in Philosophy and the History of Ideas in recognition of her Skønhedens metamorfose: De æstetiske ideers historie (The Metamorphosis of Beauty: History of Aesthetic Ideas, 2001) and Historien som værk: Værkets historie (History as a Work: The Work's History, 2006). She was appointed full professor at the university's Institute of Philosophy and the History of Ideas in 2010. In 2014, she was honoured with a second higher doctoral degree, this time a dr.theol.habil. in Systematic Theology in recognition of her Den skønne tænkning: Veje til erfaringsmetafysik. Religionsfilosofisk udmøntet (Beautiful Thinking: Pathways to the Metaphysics of Experience. Religio-philosophically Implemented). In 2014, Den skønne tænkning was nominated for the prize the Danish Research Result of the Year, and awarded the prize Honorable Reception, and in 2016, Dorthe Jørgensen received the Nonfiction Award awarded by the Danish Writers' Association.

Besides her 18 months in Berlin as a student and 9 months in New York as a young scholar, Jørgensen has also spent time abroad for longer periods in 2005-2006, 2010, and 2014 due to research positions at The Danish Institutes in Rome and Damascus.

Biography, list of publications, and further information are available at Dorthe Jørgensen's personal homepage.

== Publications ==
Jørgensen has authored 194 publications of which 23 are books. Her position as Denmark's leading expert on aesthetics is reflected in the following:

- Skønhedens metamorfose: De æstetiske idéers historie (The Metamorphosis of Beauty: History of Aesthetic Ideas, 2001)
- Viden og visdom: Spørgsmålet om de intellektuelle (Knowledge and Wisdom: The Question of the Intellectuals, 2002)
- Historien som Værk: Værkets historie (History as a Work: The Work's History, 2006)
- Skønhed - En engel gik forbi (Beauty - An Angel Passed By, 2006)
- Aglaias dans: På vej mod en æstetisk tænkning (Aglaia's Dance: Toward an Aesthetic Thinking, 2008)
- Verdenspoesi: Malerier og tankebilleder af filosof Dorthe Jørgensen og billedkunstner Bettina Winkelmann (World Poetry: Paintings and Thought Images by Philosopher Dorthe Jørgensen and Visual Artist Bettina Winkelmann, 2011)
- Den skønne tænkning: Veje til erfaringsmetafysik. Religionsfilosofisk udmøntet (Beautiful Thinking: Pathways to the Metaphysics of Experience. Religio-philosophically Implemented, 2014)
- Nærvær og eftertanke: Mit pædagogiske laboratorium (Presence and Afterthought: My Educational Laboratory, 2015)
- Hvorfor er vi så fantasiforskrækkede? Om reformationen og æstetikken (Why Are We Afraid of the Imagination? About the Reformation and Aesthetics, 2017)
- Poetic Inclinations: Ethics, History, Philosophy (2021)
- Imaginative Moods: Aesthetics, Religion, Philosophy (2021)
