= Dörte Haftendorn =

German mathematician and educator

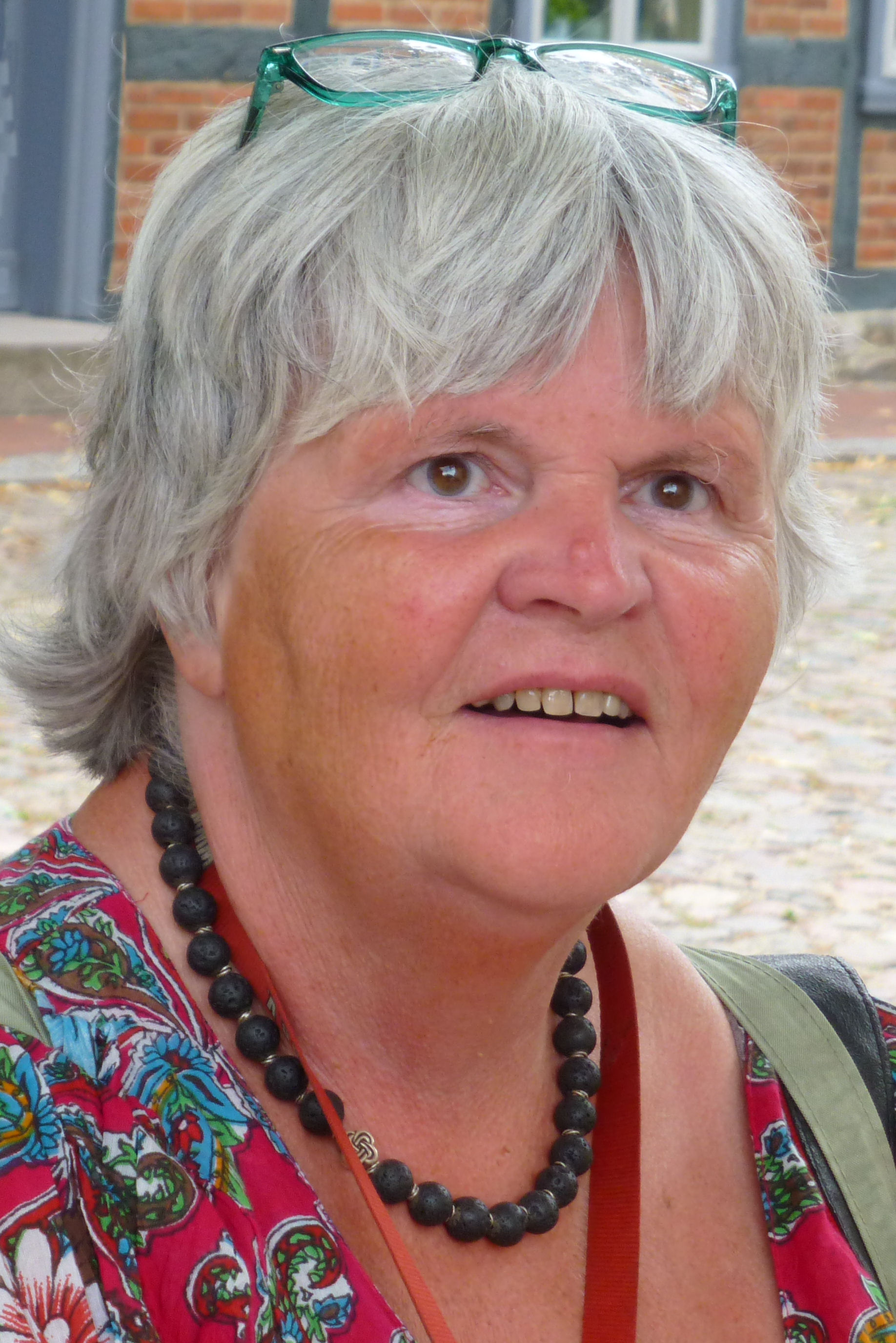
Haftendorn in 2013

Dörte Haftendorn (born March 25, 1948) is a German mathematician, mathematics educator, and textbook author who works as a professor at Leuphana University of Lüneburg.

== Education and career ==
Haftendorn earned her PhD in 1975 from the Clausthal University of Technology. Her dissertation, Additiv kommutative und idempotente Halbringe mit Faktorbedingung [Additive, commutative, and idempotent semirings with the factor condition], concerned the theory of semirings and was supervised by Hanns J. Weinert.

She taught at the Johanneum gymnasium in Lüneburg from 1975 until 2002, when she became a professor at Leuphana University of Lüneburg.

== Books ==
Haftendorn is the author of two German-language mathematics textbooks. Mathematik sehen und verstehen [Seeing and understanding mathematics] (Spektrum, 2010; 2nd ed., 2015) is a broad overview of mathematics for a popular audience, stemming from Haftendorn's "mathematics for all" lecture series. Kurven erkunden und verstehen [Exploring and understanding curves] (Spektrum, 2016) is an introductory textbook in geometry focusing on the geometry of curves and incorporating calculations with GeoGebra.
