= Dorthe Ravnsbæk =

Inorganic / materials chemist

Professor Dorthe Bomholdt Ravnsbæk is an inorganic / materials chemist who has been internationally recognized for her work in battery technology.

== Background ==
Ravnsbæk received her Ph.D. from the iNANO branch of Aarhus University in 2011, and was a postdoctoral researcher with Yet-Ming Chiang at the Massachusetts Institute of Technology. Ravnsbæk was appointed to the faculty of University of Southern Denmark in 2014. Her research focuses on different Metal hydride combinations that could potentially power batteries from cheap, abundant sodium ions in place of Lithium-ion battery materials. She co-Leads the ECOSTORE initiative at SDU.

== Awards ==
- 2016 - L'Oréal-UNESCO For Women in Science Awards Rising Talent
- 2011 - EuroScience Young Researcher Award
