= Niobium–titanium =

Superconducting alloy of niobium and titanium

Niobium–titanium (Nb-Ti) is a ductile alloy of niobium and titanium, used industrially as a type II superconductor wire for superconducting magnets, normally as Nb-Ti fibres in an aluminium or copper matrix.

Its critical temperature is about 10 kelvins.

The high critical magnetic field and high critical supercurrent density of Nb-Ti was discovered in 1962 at Atomics International by T. G. Berlincourt and R. R. Hake. Nb-Ti alloys are notable for their easy workability and affordability, distinguishing them from other superconducting materials.

Nb-Ti alloys have a maximal critical magnetic field of about 15 teslas and, thus, are suitable for fabricating supermagnets capable of generating magnetic fields of up to about 10 teslas. For stronger magnetic fields, higher performance superconductors, such as niobium–tin, are commonly used, but these are more difficult to fabricate and thus more expensive to produce.

The global superconductivity market was valued at around five billion euros in 2014. Magnet resonance imaging (MRI) systems, most of which use Nb-Ti, accounted for about 80% of the total market value.

== Notable uses ==
=== Superconducting magnets ===
A bubble chamber at Argonne National Laboratory has a 4.8-meter-diameter Nb-Ti magnet, which produces a magnetic field of 1.8 tesla.

About 1,000 Nb-Ti SC magnets were used in the 4-mile-long main ring of the Tevatron accelerator at Fermilab. The magnets were wound with 50 tons of copper cables, containing 17 tons of Nb-Ti filaments. They operate at 4.5 K and generate fields of up to 4.5 T.

1999: The Relativistic Heavy Ion Collider uses 1,740 Nb-Ti SC 3.45 T magnets to bend beams in its 3.8 km double storage ring.

In the Large Hadron Collider particle accelerator, the magnets contain 1,200 tonnes of Nb-Ti cable, of which 470 tons are Nb-Ti and the rest copper, and they are cooled to 1.9 K to allow the safe operation of fields of up to 8.3 T.

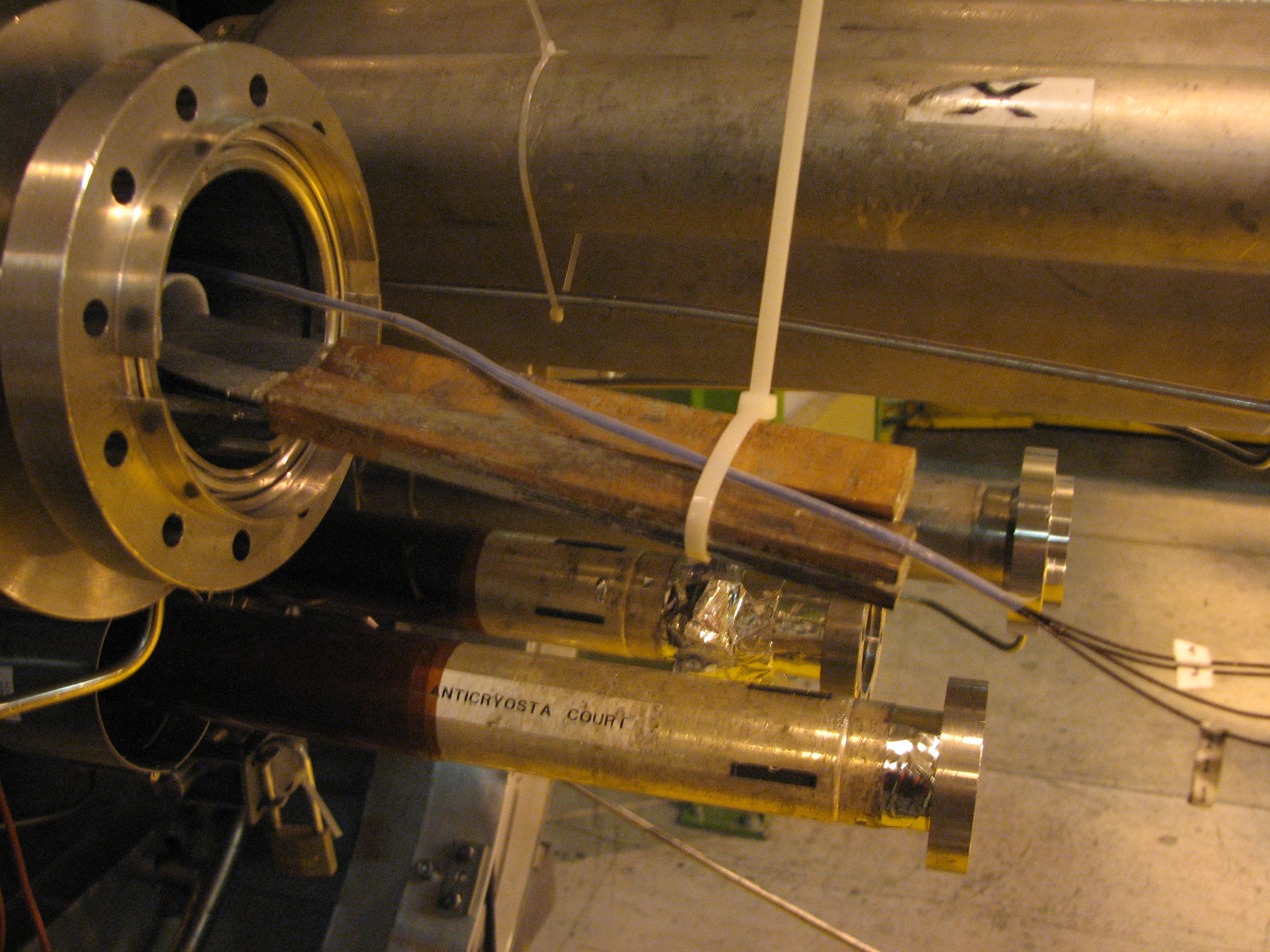
Nb-Ti wires coming out of an LHC dipole magnet.

Niobium–titanium superconducting magnet coils (liquid-helium-cooled) were built to be used in the Alpha Magnetic Spectrometer mission at the International Space Station. They were later replaced by non-superconducting magnets.

The experimental fusion reactor ITER uses niobium–titanium for its poloidal field coils. In 2008, a test coil achieved stable operation at 52 kA and 6.4 T.

The Wendelstein 7-X stellarator uses Nb-Ti for its magnets, which are cooled to 4 K to create a 3 T field.

The SCMaglev uses Nb-Ti for the magnets onboard trains. A train using the technology currently holds the train speed world record of 603 km/h. It will be deployed for the Chūō Shinkansen, providing passenger service between Tokyo, Nagoya, and Osaka at a planned maximum operating speed of 505 km/h. Construction is underway for the Tokyo–Nagoya segment, with a planned opening date of 2035.

== Gallery ==
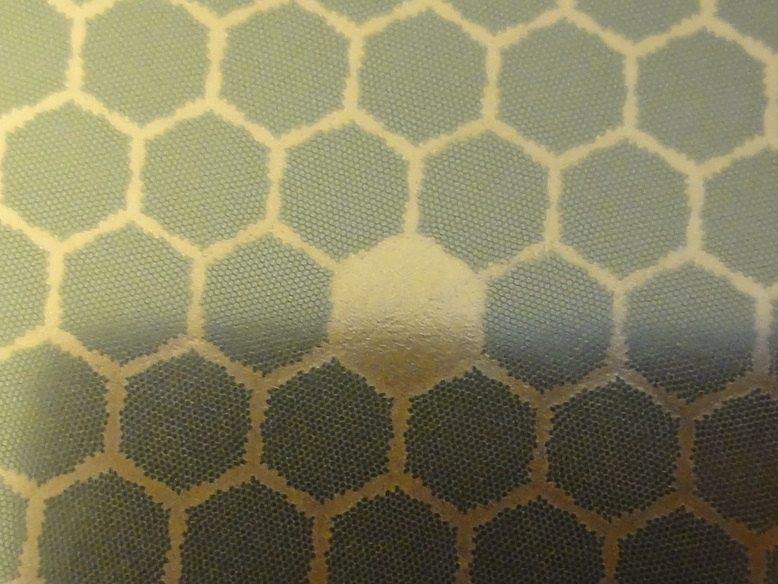

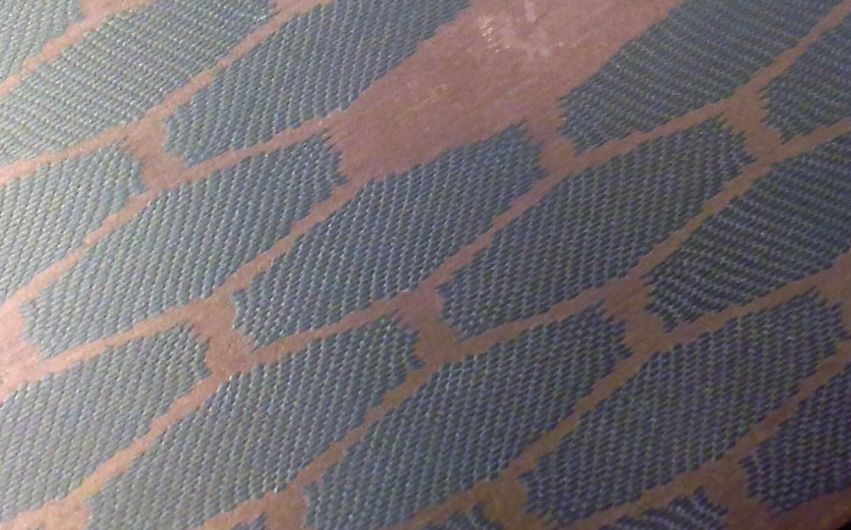

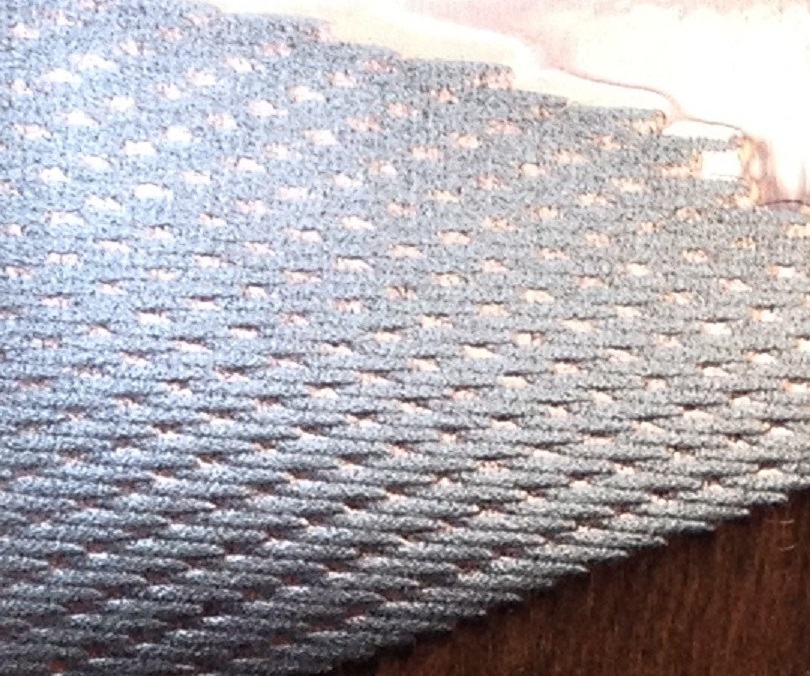

== See also ==
- Niobium–tin
- Vanadium–gallium, usable up to 18 tesla
