= Fault current limiter =

A fault current limiter (FCL), also known as fault current controller (FCC), is a device which limits the prospective fault current when a fault occurs (e.g. in a power transmission network) without complete disconnection. The term includes superconducting, solid-state and inductive devices.

== Applications ==
Electric power distribution systems include circuit breakers to disconnect power in case of a fault, but to maximize reliability, they wish to disconnect the smallest possible portion of the network. This means that even the smallest circuit breakers, as well as all wiring to them, must be able to disconnect large fault currents.

A problem arises if the electricity supply is upgraded, by adding new generation capacity or by adding cross-connections. Because these increase the amount of power that can be supplied, all of the branch circuits must have their bus bars and circuit breakers upgraded to handle the new higher fault current limit.

This poses a particular problem when distributed generation, such as wind farms and rooftop solar power, is added to an existing electric grid. It is desirable to be able to add additional power sources without large system-wide upgrades.

A simple solution is to add electrical impedance to the circuit. This limits the rate at which current can increase, which limits the level the fault current can rise to before the breaker is opened. However, this also limits the ability of the circuit to satisfy rapidly changing demand, so the addition or removal of large loads causes unstable power.

A fault current limiter is a nonlinear element which has a low impedance at normal current levels, but presents a higher impedance at fault current levels. Further, this change is extremely rapid, before a circuit breaker can trip a few milliseconds later. (High-power circuit breakers are synchronized to the alternating current zero crossing to minimize arcing.)

While the power is unstable during the fault, it is not completely disconnected. After the faulting branch is disconnected, the fault current limiter automatically returns to normal operation.

== Superconducting fault current limiter ==
Superconducting fault current limiters exploit the extremely rapid loss of superconductivity (called "quenching") above a critical combination of temperature, current density, and magnetic field. In normal operation, current flows through the superconductor without resistance and negligible impedance.

If a fault develops, the superconductor quenches, its resistance rises sharply, and current is diverted to a parallel circuit with the desired higher impedance. (The structure is not usable as a circuit breaker, because the normally-conducting superconductive material does not have a high enough resistance. It is only high enough to cause sufficient heating to melt the material.)

Superconducting fault current limiters are described as being in one of two major categories: resistive or inductive.

In a resistive FCL, the current passes directly through the superconductor. When it quenches, the sharp rise in resistance reduces the fault current from what it would otherwise be (the prospective fault current). A resistive FCL can be either DC or AC. If it is AC, then there will be a steady power dissipation from AC losses (superconducting hysteresis losses) which must be removed by the cryogenic system. An AC FCL is usually made from wire wound non-inductively; otherwise the inductance of the device would create an extra constant power loss on the system.

Inductive FCLs come in many variants, but the basic concept is a transformer with a resistive FCL as the secondary. In un-faulted operation, there is no resistance in the secondary and so the inductance of the device is low. A fault current quenches the superconductor, the secondary becomes resistive and the inductance of the whole device rises. The advantage of this design is that there is no heat ingress through current leads into the superconductor, and so the cryogenic power load may be lower. However, the large amount of iron required means that inductive FCLs are much bigger and heavier than resistive FCLs. The first successful field test of an HTS FCL of this type was by SC Power Systems, a division of Zenergy Power plc in 2009.

The quench process is a two-step process. First, a small region quenches directly in response to a high current density. This section rapidly heats by Joule heating, and the increase in temperature quenches adjacent regions. GridON Ltd has developed the first commercial inductive FCL for distribution & transmission networks. Using a unique and proprietary concept of magnetic-flux alteration - requiring no superconducting or cryogenic components - the self-triggered FCL instantaneously increases its impedance tenfold upon fault condition. It limits the fault current for its entire duration and recovers to its normal condition immediately thereafter. This inductive FCL is scalable to extra high voltage ratings.

== Development of the superconducting fault current limiters ==
FCLs are under active development. In 2007, there were at least six national and international projects using magnesium diboride wire or YBCO tape, and two using BSCCO-2212 rods. Countries active in FCL development are Germany, the UK, the US, Korea and China. In 2007, the US Department of Energy spent $29m on three FCL development projects.

High temperature superconductors are required for practical FCLs. AC losses generate constant heat inside the superconductor, and the cost of cryogenic cooling at liquid helium temperatures required by low temperature superconductors makes the whole device uneconomic.

First applications for FCLs are likely to be used to help control medium-voltage electricity distribution systems, followed by electric-drive ships: naval vessels, submarines and cruise ships. Larger FCLs may eventually be deployed in high-voltage transmission systems.

== See also ==
- Current limiting
- Power-system protection
- Superconductivity
  - Magnesium diboride
  - YBCO
