= Superconducting magnet =

Electromagnet made from coils of superconducting wire

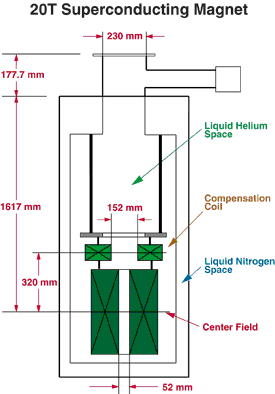
Schematic of a 20-tesla superconducting magnet with vertical bore

A superconducting magnet is an electromagnet made from coils of superconducting wire. They must be cooled to cryogenic temperatures during operation. In its superconducting state the wire has no electrical resistance and therefore can conduct much larger electric currents than ordinary wire, creating intense magnetic fields. Superconducting magnets can produce stronger magnetic fields than all but the strongest non-superconducting electromagnets, and large superconducting magnets can be cheaper to operate because no energy is dissipated as heat in the windings. They are used in MRI instruments in hospitals, and in scientific equipment such as NMR spectrometers, mass spectrometers, fusion reactors and particle accelerators. They are also used for levitation, guidance and propulsion in a magnetic levitation (maglev) railway system being constructed in Japan.

== Construction ==
=== Cooling ===
During operation, the magnet windings must be cooled below their critical temperature, the temperature at which the winding material changes from the normal resistive state and becomes a superconductor, which is in the cryogenic range far below room temperature. The windings are typically cooled to temperatures significantly below their critical temperature, because the lower the temperature, the better superconductive windings work—the higher the currents and magnetic fields they can stand without returning to their non-superconductive state. Two types of cooling systems are commonly used to maintain magnet windings at temperatures sufficient to maintain superconductivity:

==== Liquid-cooled ====
Liquid helium is used as a coolant for many superconductive windings. It has a boiling point of 4.2 K, far below the critical temperature of most winding materials. The magnet and coolant are contained in a thermally insulated container (dewar) called a cryostat. To keep the helium from boiling away, the cryostat is usually constructed with an outer jacket containing (significantly cheaper) liquid nitrogen at 77 K. Alternatively, a thermal shield made of conductive material and maintained in 40 K – 60 K temperature range, cooled by conductive connections to the cryocooler cold head, is placed around the helium-filled vessel to keep the heat input to the latter at acceptable level. One of the goals of the search for high temperature superconductors is to build magnets that can be cooled by liquid nitrogen alone. At temperatures above about 20 K cooling can be achieved without boiling off cryogenic liquids.

==== Mechanical cooling ====
Because of increasing cost and the dwindling availability of liquid helium, many superconducting systems are cooled using two stage mechanical refrigeration. In general two types of mechanical cryocoolers are employed which have sufficient cooling power to maintain magnets below their critical temperature. The Gifford–McMahon cryocooler has been commercially available since the 1960s and has found widespread application. The G-M regenerator cycle in a cryocooler operates using a piston type displacer and heat exchanger. Alternatively, 1999 marked the first commercial application using a pulse tube cryocooler. This design of cryocooler has become increasingly common due to low vibration and long service interval as pulse tube designs use an acoustic process in lieu of mechanical displacement. In a typical two-stage refrigerator, the first stage will offer higher cooling capacity but at higher temperature (≈ 77 K) with the second stage reaching ≈ 4.2 K and < 2.0 W of cooling power. In use, the first stage is used primarily for ancillary cooling of the cryostat with the second stage used primarily for cooling the magnet.

=== Coil winding materials ===
The maximal magnetic field achievable in a superconducting magnet is limited by the field at which the winding material ceases to be superconducting, its "critical field", H_{c}, which for type-II superconductors is its upper critical field. Another limiting factor is the "critical current", I_{c}, at which the winding material also ceases to be superconducting. Advances in magnets have focused on creating better winding materials.

The superconducting portions of most current magnets are composed of niobium–titanium. This material has critical temperature of 10 K and can superconduct at up to about 15 T. More expensive magnets can be made of niobium–tin (Nb_{3}Sn). These have a T_{c} of 18 K. When operating at 4.2 K they are able to withstand a much higher magnetic field intensity, up to 25 T to 30 T. Unfortunately, it is far more difficult to make the required filaments from this material. This is why sometimes a combination of Nb_{3}Sn for the high-field sections and NbTi for the lower-field sections is used. Vanadium–gallium is another material used for the high-field inserts.

High-temperature superconductors (e.g. BSCCO or YBCO) may be used for high-field inserts when required magnetic fields are higher than Nb_{3}Sn can manage. BSCCO, YBCO or magnesium diboride may also be used for current leads, conducting high currents from room temperature into the cold magnet without an accompanying large heat leak from resistive leads.

=== Conductor structure ===
The coil windings of a superconducting magnet are made of wires or tapes of Type II superconductors (e.g.niobium–titanium or niobium–tin). The wire or tape itself may be made of tiny filaments (about 20 micrometres thick) of superconductor in a copper matrix. The copper is needed to add mechanical stability, and to provide a low resistance path for the large currents in case the temperature rises above T_{c} or the current rises above I_{c} and superconductivity is lost. These filaments need to be this small because in this type of superconductor the current only flows in a surface layer whose thickness is limited to the London penetration depth (see Skin effect). The coil must be carefully designed to withstand (or counteract) magnetic pressure and Lorentz forces that could otherwise cause wire fracture or crushing of insulation between adjacent turns.

== Operation ==
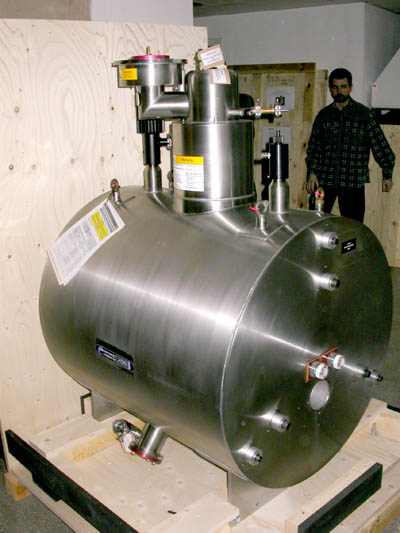
7 T horizontal bore superconducting magnet, part of a mass spectrometer. The magnet itself is inside the cylindrical cryostat.

=== Power supply ===
The current to the coil windings is provided by a high current, very low voltage DC power supply, since in steady state the only voltage across the magnet is due to the resistance of the feeder wires. Any change to the current through the magnet must be done very slowly, first because electrically the magnet is a large inductor and an abrupt current change will result in a large voltage spike across the windings, and more importantly because fast changes in current can cause eddy currents and mechanical stresses in the windings that can precipitate a quench (see below). So the power supply is usually microprocessor-controlled, programmed to accomplish current changes gradually, in gentle ramps. It usually takes several minutes to energize or de-energize a laboratory-sized magnet.

=== Persistent mode ===
An alternate operating mode used by most superconducting magnets is to short-circuit the windings with a piece of superconductor once the magnet has been energized. The windings become a closed superconducting loop, the power supply can be turned off, and persistent currents will flow for months, preserving the magnetic field. The advantage of this persistent mode is that stability of the magnetic field is better than is achievable with the best power supplies, and no energy is needed to power the windings. The short circuit is made by a 'persistent switch', a piece of superconductor inside the magnet connected across the winding ends, attached to a small heater. When the magnet is first turned on, the switch wire is heated above its transition temperature, so it is resistive. Since the winding itself has no resistance, no current flows through the switch wire. To go to persistent mode, the supply current is adjusted until the desired magnetic field is obtained, then the heater is turned off. The persistent switch cools to its superconducting temperature, short-circuiting the windings. Then the power supply can be turned off. The winding current, and the magnetic field, will not actually persist forever, but will decay slowly according to a normal inductive time constant (L/R):

$$H(t) = H_0 e^{-(R/L)t} ,$$

where $R$ is a small residual resistance in the superconducting windings due to joints or a phenomenon called flux motion resistance. Nearly all commercial superconducting magnets are equipped with persistent switches.

The heater is nothing more than a small resistive element that warms up by Joule effect; in practice, it must be powered by an external current-controlled supply, typically delivering a few tens of milliamperes at a few volts, in order to drive the superconducting switch above its transition temperature.

=== Magnet quench ===
A quench is an abnormal termination of magnet operation that occurs when part of the superconducting coil enters the normal (resistive) state. This can occur because the field inside the magnet is too large, the rate of change of field is too large (causing eddy currents and resultant heating in the copper support matrix), or a combination of the two. More rarely a defect in the magnet can cause a quench. When this happens, that particular spot is subject to rapid Joule heating from the enormous current, which raises the temperature of the surrounding regions. This pushes those regions into the normal state as well, which leads to more heating in a chain reaction. The entire magnet rapidly becomes normal (this can take several seconds, depending on the size of the superconducting coil). This is accompanied by a loud bang as the energy in the magnetic field is converted to heat, and rapid boil-off of the cryogenic fluid. The abrupt decrease of current can result in kilovolt inductive voltage spikes and arcing. Permanent damage to the magnet is rare, but components can be damaged by localized heating, high voltages, or large mechanical forces. In practice, magnets usually have safety devices to stop or limit the current when the beginning of a quench is detected. If a large magnet undergoes a quench, the inert vapor formed by the evaporating cryogenic fluid can present a significant asphyxiation hazard to operators by displacing breathable air.

A large section of the superconducting magnets in CERN's Large Hadron Collider unexpectedly quenched during start-up operations in 2008, necessitating the replacement of a number of magnets. In order to mitigate against potentially destructive quenches, the superconducting magnets that form the LHC are equipped with fast-ramping heaters that are activated once a quench event is detected by the complex quench protection system. As the dipole bending magnets are connected in series, each power circuit includes 154 individual magnets, and should a quench event occur, the entire combined stored energy of these magnets must be dumped at once. This energy is transferred into massive blocks of metal which heat up to several hundred degrees Celsius due to the resistive heating, in a matter of seconds. Although undesirable, a magnet quench is a "fairly routine event" during the operation of a particle accelerator.

Quench events are detected by specialized quench detection systems (QDS), which monitor the voltage across different sections of a superconducting coil. When part of the coil becomes resistive, a voltage imbalance develops between coil segments; if this exceeds a predefined threshold, the quench protection system is triggered. Once a quench is confirmed, the protection electronics activate heaters or energy-dissipation circuits to safely spread and extract the stored magnetic energy, minimizing the risk of damage.

=== Magnet "training" ===
In certain cases, superconducting magnets designed for very high currents require extensive bedding in, to enable the magnets to function at their full planned currents and fields. This is known as "training" the magnet, and involves a type of material memory effect. One situation this is required in is the case of particle colliders such as CERN's Large Hadron Collider. The magnets of the LHC were planned to run at 8 TeV (2 × 4 TeV) on its first run and 14 TeV (2 × 7 TeV) on its second run, but were initially operated at a lower energy of 3.5 TeV and 6.5 TeV per beam respectively. Because of initial crystallographic defects in the material, they will initially lose their superconducting ability ("quench") at a lower level than their design current. CERN states that this is due to electromagnetic forces causing tiny movements in the magnets, which in turn cause superconductivity to be lost when operating at the high precision needed for their planned current. By repeatedly running the magnets at a lower current and then slightly increasing the current until they quench under control, the magnet will gradually both gain the required ability to withstand the higher currents of its design specification without quenches occurring, and have any such issues "shaken" out of them, until they are eventually able to operate reliably at their full planned current without experiencing quenches.

== History ==
Although the idea of making electromagnets with superconducting wire was proposed by Heike Kamerlingh Onnes shortly after he discovered superconductivity in 1911, a practical superconducting electromagnet had to await the discovery of superconducting materials that could support large critical supercurrent densities in high magnetic fields. The first successful superconducting magnet was built by G.B. Yntema in 1955 using niobium wire and achieved a field of 0.7 T at 4.2 K. Then, in 1961, J.E. Kunzler, E. Buehler, F.S.L. Hsu, and J.H. Wernick made the discovery that a compound of niobium and tin could support critical-supercurrent densities greater than 100,000 amperes per square centimetre in magnetic fields of 8.8 teslas. Despite its brittle nature, niobium–tin has since proved extremely useful in supermagnets generating magnetic fields up to 20 T.

The persistent switch was invented in 1960 by Dwight Adams while a postdoctoral associate at Stanford University. The second persistent switch was constructed at the University of Florida by M.S. student R.D. Lichti in 1963. It has been preserved in a showcase in the UF Physics Building.

In 1962, T.G. Berlincourt and R.R. Hake discovered the high-critical-magnetic-field, high-critical-supercurrent-density properties of niobium–titanium alloys. Although niobium–titanium alloys possess less spectacular superconducting properties than niobium–tin, they are highly ductile, easily fabricated, and economical. Useful in supermagnets generating magnetic fields up to 10 teslas, niobium–titanium alloys are the most widely used supermagnet materials.

In 1986, the discovery of high temperature superconductors by Georg Bednorz and Karl Müller energized the field, raising the possibility of magnets that could be cooled by liquid nitrogen instead of the more difficult-to-work-with helium.

In 2007, a magnet with windings of YBCO achieved a world record field of 26.8 T. The US National Research Council had a goal of creating a 30-tesla superconducting magnet.

Globally in 2014, almost six billion US dollars' worth of economic activity resulted for which superconductivity was indispensable. MRI systems, most of which employ niobium–titanium, accounted for about 80% of that total.

In 2016, Yoon et al. reported a 26 T no-insulation superconducting magnet that they built out of GdBa_{2}Cu_{3}O_{7–x}, using a technique which was previously reported in 2013.

In 2017, a YBCO magnet created by the National High Magnetic Field Laboratory (NHMFL) broke the previous world record with a strength of 32 T. This is an all superconducting user magnet, designed to last for many decades. They held the record as of March 2018.

In 2019, a new world-record of 32.35 T with all-superconducting magnet was achieved by the Institute of Electrical Engineering, Chinese Academy of Sciences (IEE, CAS). No-insulation technique for the HTS insert magnet is also used.

In 2019, the NHMFL also developed a non-insulated YBCO test coil combined with a resistive magnet and broke the lab's own world record for highest continuous magnetic field for any configuration of magnet at 45.5 T.

A 1.2 GHz (28.2 T) NMR magnet was achieved in 2020 using an HTS magnet.

In 2022, the Hefei Institutes of Physical Science, Chinese Academy of Sciences (HFIPS, CAS) claimed a new world record for the strongest steady magnetic field of 45.22 T reached, while the previous NHMFL 45.5 T record in 2019 was actually reached when the magnet failed immediately in a quench.

== Uses ==
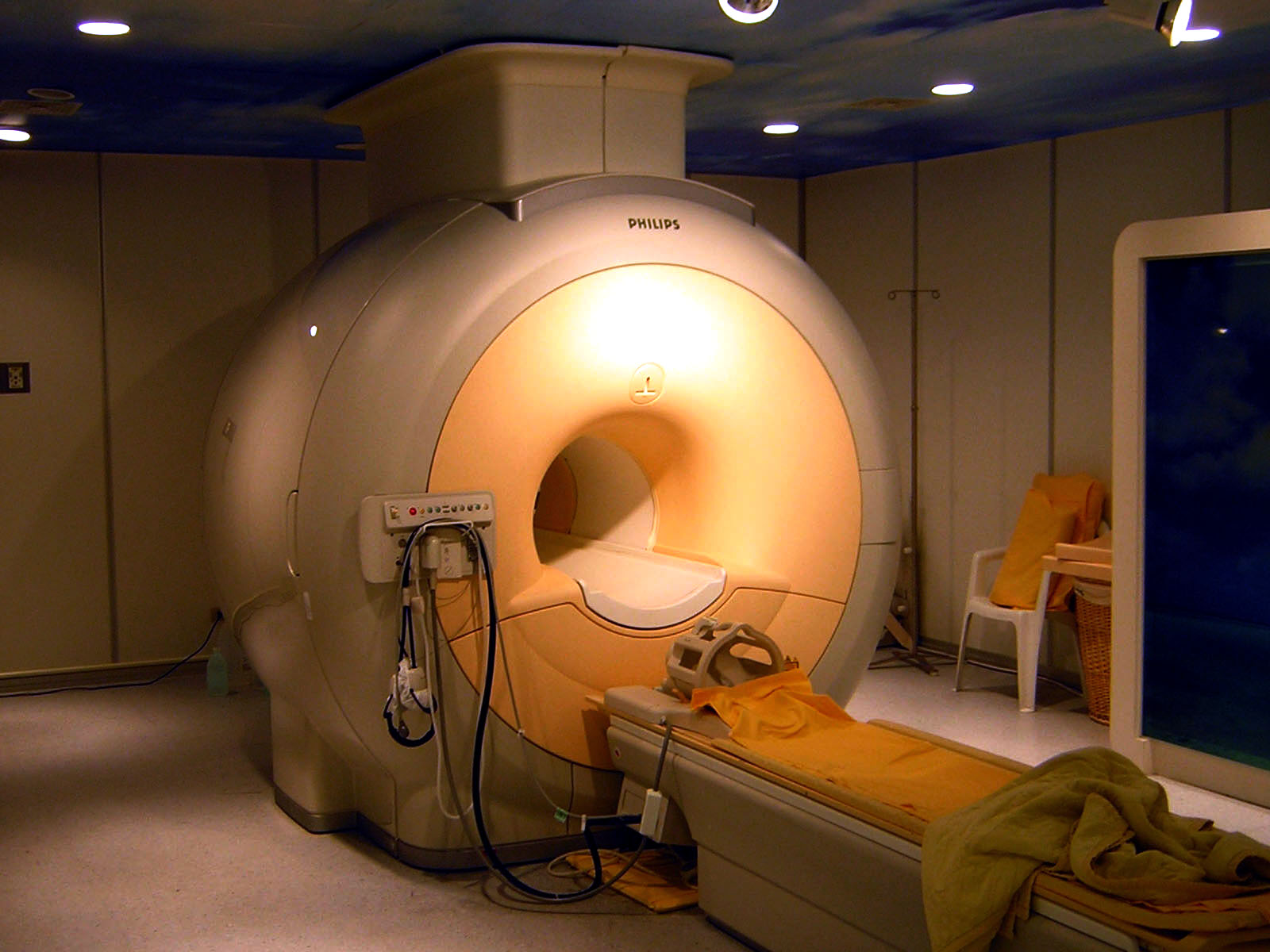
A magnetic resonance imaging (MRI) scanner using a superconducting magnet. The magnet is inside the doughnut-shaped housing and can create a 3-tesla field inside the central hole.

Superconducting magnets have a number of advantages over resistive electromagnets. They can generate much stronger magnetic fields than ferromagnetic-core electromagnets, which are limited to fields of around 2 T. The field is generally more stable, resulting in less noisy measurements. They can be smaller, and the area at the center of the magnet where the field is created is empty rather than being occupied by an iron core. Large magnets can consume much less power. In the persistent state (above), the only power the magnet consumes is that needed for refrigeration equipment. Higher fields can be achieved with cooled resistive electromagnets, as superconducting coils enter the non-superconducting state at high fields. Steady fields of over 40 T can be achieved, usually by combining a Bitter electromagnet with a superconducting magnet (often as an insert).

Superconducting magnets are widely used in MRI scanners, NMR equipment, mass spectrometers, magnetic separation processes, and particle accelerators.

=== Rail transport ===
In Japan, after decades of research and development into superconducting maglev by Japanese National Railways and later Central Japan Railway Company (JR Central), the Japanese government gave permission to JR Central to build the Chūō Shinkansen, linking Tokyo to Nagoya and later to Osaka.

=== Particle accelerator ===
One of the most challenging uses of superconducting magnets is in the LHC particle accelerator. Its niobium–titanium (Nb–Ti) magnets operate at 1.9 K to allow them to run safely at 8.3 T. Each magnet stores 7 MJ. In total the magnets store 10.4 GJ. Once or twice a day, as protons are accelerated from 450 GeV to 7 TeV, the field of the superconducting bending magnets is increased from 0.54 T to 8.3 T.

=== Fusion reactor ===
The central solenoid and toroidal field superconducting magnets designed for the ITER fusion reactor use niobium–tin (Nb_{3}Sn) as a superconductor. The central solenoid coil carries a current of 46 kA and produce a magnetic field of 13.5 T. The 18 toroidal field coils at a maximum field of 11.8 T store an energy of 41 GJ (total?). They have been tested at a record current of 80 kA. Other lower field ITER magnets (PF and CC) use niobium–titanium. Most of the ITER magnets have their field varied many times per hour.

=== Mass spectrometer ===
One high-resolution mass spectrometer planned to use a 21-tesla SC magnet.

== See also ==
- Fault current limiter
- Flux pumping
