= Dörthe Binkert =

German writer

Dörthe Binkert (born 1 January 1949) is a German novelist and non-fiction writer.

== Biography ==
Born in Hagen in Westphalia, Binkert grew up in Frankfurt where she studied German literature, art history and politics at Frankfurt University. For the next 30 years she worked as editor and editor-in-chief for major German publishers. Since 1975 she has been living in Zürich where she completed her first historical novel, Weit übers Meer (translated as She Wore Only White), in 2008. It is the story of a young woman who is trying to escape her past by taking a transatlantic voyage to America.

== Selected works ==
=== Novels ===
- Binkert, Dörthe (2008). Weit übers Meer Roman (in German). Munich. ISBN 978-3-423-24693-4. OCLC 260046113.
  - Binkert, Dörthe; Schuldt, Lesley (2012). She wore only white. Las Vegas, NV. ISBN 978-1-61218-291-9. OCLC 779259602.
- Binkert, Dörthe (2010). Bildnis eines Mädchens Roman (in German). Munich. ISBN 978-3-423-24784-9. OCLC 640133550.
- Binkert, Dörthe (2012). Brombeersommer : Roman. Munich: Dtv. ISBN 978-3-423-24913-3. OCLC 802500711.

=== Non-fiction ===
- Binkert, Dörthe (2007). All die schönen Wörter die wir vor dem Untergang retten sollten (in German). Munich: Thiele. ISBN 978-3-85179-019-1. OCLC 259929714.
- Binkert, Dörthe (2011). Frauen in Gold Musen und Modelle des Malers Gustav Klimt (in German). Munich. ISBN 978-3-85179-175-4. OCLC 767797573.
- Binkert, Dörthe; Heidenreich, Elke (2012). Frauen und Rosen (in German). Munich: Thiele. ISBN 978-3-85179-184-6. OCLC 798054336.
- Binkert, Dörthe (2013). Frauen und ihre Katzen (in German). Munich. ISBN 978-3-85179-237-9. OCLC 840905883.
