= Niobium–tin =

Superconducting intermetallic compound

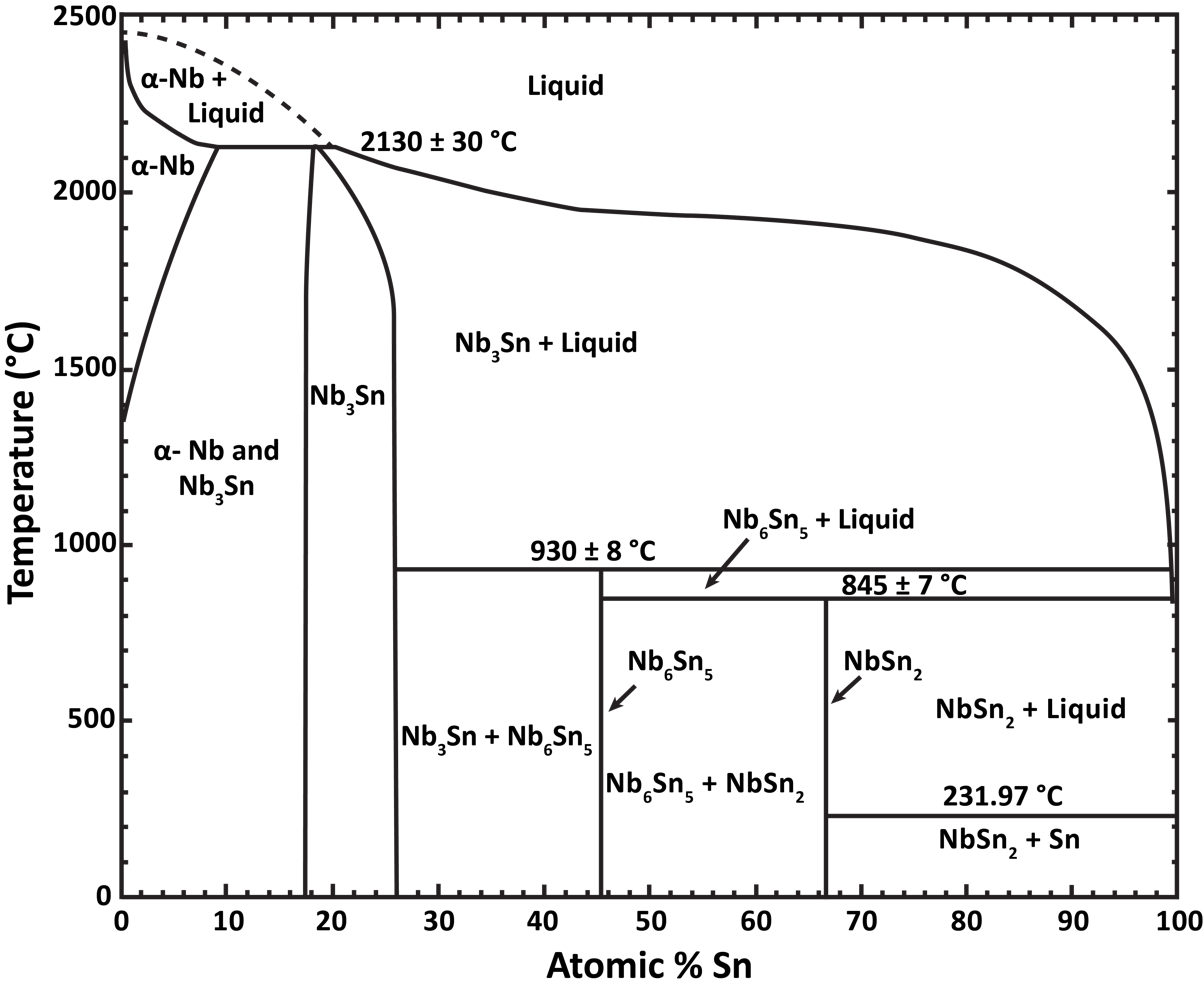
Nb-Sn phase diagram

Niobium–tin is an intermetallic compound of niobium (Nb) and tin (Sn), used industrially as a type-II superconductor. This intermetallic compound has a simple structure: A3B. It is more expensive than niobium–titanium (NbTi), but remains superconducting up to a magnetic flux density of 30 teslas [T] (300,000 G), compared to a limit of roughly 15 T for NbTi.

Nb_{3}Sn was discovered to be a superconductor in 1954. The material's ability to support high currents and magnetic fields was discovered in 1961 and started the era of large-scale applications of superconductivity.

The critical temperature is 18.3 kelvins (−254.8 °C; −426.7 °F). Application temperatures are commonly around 4.2 K (−268.95 °C; −452.11 °F), the boiling point of liquid helium at atmospheric pressure.

In April 2008 a record non-copper current density was claimed of 2,643 A mm^{−2} at 12 T and 4.2 K.

== History ==
Nb_{3}Sn was discovered to be a superconductor in 1954, one year after the discovery of V_{3}Si, the first example of an A_{3}B superconductor. In 1961 it was discovered that niobium–tin still exhibits superconductivity at large currents and strong magnetic fields, thus becoming the first known material to support the high currents and fields necessary for making useful high-power magnets and electric power machinery.

== Notable uses ==
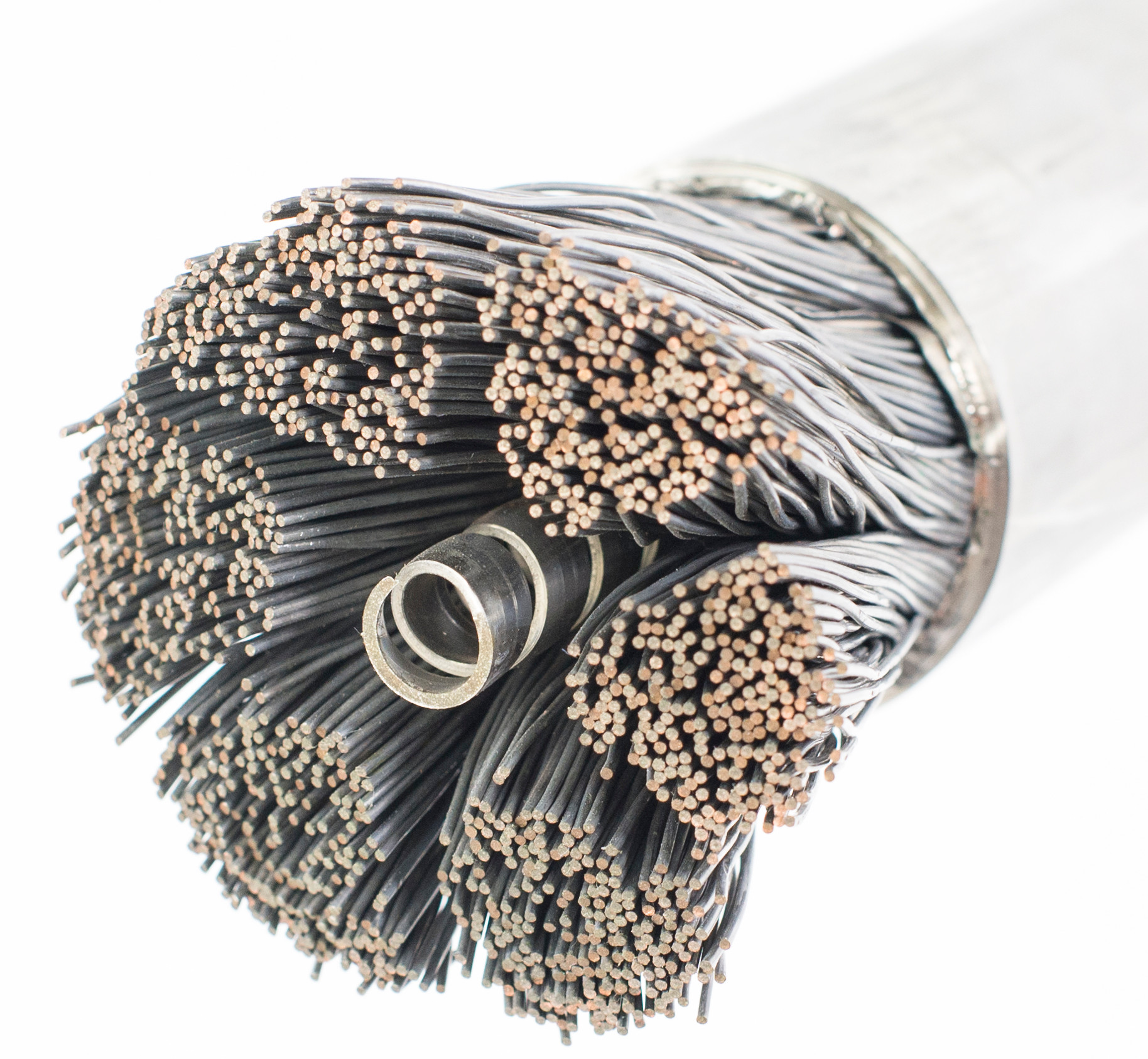
Nb_{3}Sn wire from the ITER fusion reactor, which is currently under construction.

The central solenoid and toroidal field superconducting magnets for the planned experimental ITER fusion reactor use niobium–tin as a superconductor. The central solenoid coil will produce a field of 13.5 teslas (135,000 G). The toroidal field coils will operate at a maximum field of 11.8 T. Estimated use is 600 metric tons (590 long tons) of Nb_{3}Sn strands and 250 metric tonnes of NbTi strands.

At the Large Hadron Collider at CERN, extra-strong quadrupole magnets (for focussing beams) made with niobium–tin are being installed in key points of the accelerator between late 2018 and early 2020. Niobium tin had been proposed in 1986 as an alternative to niobium–titanium, since it allowed coolants less complex than superfluid helium, but this was not pursued in order to avoid delays while competing with the then-planned US-led Superconducting Super Collider.

== Composite wire ==
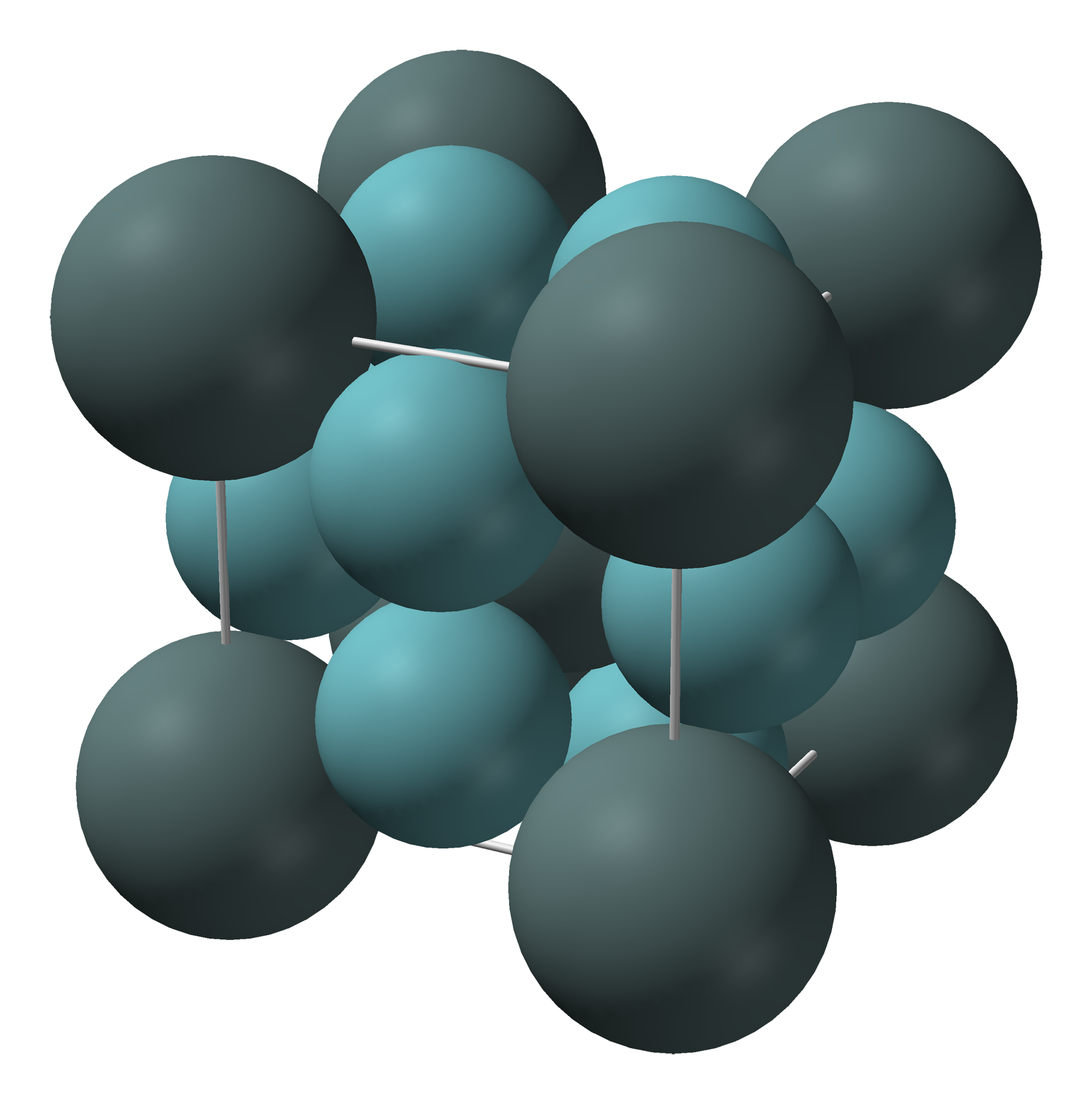
Unit cell of the A3B phases of Nb_{3}Sn

Mechanically, Nb_{3}Sn is extremely brittle and thus cannot be easily drawn into a wire, which is necessary for winding superconducting magnets. To overcome this, wire manufacturers typically draw down composite wires containing ductile precursors. The "internal tin" process includes separate alloys of Nb, Cu and Sn. The "bronze" process contains Nb in a copper–tin bronze matrix. With both processes the strand is typically drawn to final size and coiled into a solenoid or cable before heat treatment. It is only during heat treatment that the Sn reacts with the Nb to form the brittle, superconducting niobium–tin compound. The powder-in-tube process is also used.

The high field section of modern NMR magnets are composed of niobium–tin wire.

=== Strain effects ===
Inside a magnet the wires are subjected to high Lorentz forces as well as thermal stresses during cooling. Any strain in the niobium tin causes a decrease in the superconducting performance of the material, and can cause the brittle material to fracture. Because of this, the wires need to be as stiff as possible. The Young's modulus of niobium tin is around 140 GPa (gigapascals) at room temperature. However, the stiffness drops to as low as 50 GPa when the material is cooled below 50 K (−223.2 °C; −369.7 °F). Engineers must therefore find ways of improving the strength of the material. Strengthening fibers are often incorporated in the composite niobium tin wires to increase their stiffness. Common strengthening materials include Inconel, stainless steel, molybdenum, and tantalum because of their high stiffness at cryogenic temperatures. Since the thermal expansion coefficients of the matrix, fiber, and niobium tin are all different, significant amounts of strain can be generated after the wire is annealed and cooled all the way down to operating temperatures. This strain is referred to as the pre-strain in the wire. Since any strain in the niobium tin generally decreases the superconducting performance of the material, a proper combination of materials must be used to minimize this value. The pre-strain in a composite wire can be calculated by the formula

$$\varepsilon _{m}=\frac{V_{c}E_{c}\{ \frac{\Delta L}{L_c}-\frac{\Delta L}{L_f} \}-\sigma_{cu,y}V_{cu}-\sigma_{bz,y}V_{bz}}{V_fE_f+V_cE_c}.$$

where ε_{m} is the pre-strain, ΔL/L_{c} and ΔL/L_{f} are changes in length due to thermal expansion of the niobium tin conduit and strengthening fiber respectively; V_{c}, V_{f}, V_{cu}, and V_{bz} are the volume fractions of conduit, fiber, copper, and bronze; σ_{cu,y}, and σ_{bz,y} are the yield stresses of copper and bronze; and E_{c}, and E_{f} are the Young's modulus of the conduit and the fiber. Since the copper and bronze matrix deforms plastically during cooldown, they apply a constant stress equal to their yield stress. The conduit and fiber, however, deform elastically by design. Commercial superconductors manufactured by the bronze process generally have a pre-strain value around 0.2% to 0.4%. The so-called strain effect causes a reduction in the superconducting properties of many materials including niobium tin. The critical strain, the maximum allowable strain over which superconductivity is lost, is given by the formula

$$\varepsilon _c=\varepsilon_{co}\{ 1-\frac{B}{B_{c2m}} \}.$$

where ε_{c} is the critical strain, ε_{co} is a material dependent parameter equal to 1.5% in tension (−1.8% in compression) for niobium tin, B is the applied magnetic field, and B_{c2m} is the maximum upper critical field of the material. Strain in the niobium tin causes tetragonal distortions in the crystal lattice, which changes the electron-phonon interaction spectrum. This is equivalent to an increase in disorder in the A15 crystal structure. At high enough strain, around 1%, the niobium tin conduit will develop fractures and the current carrying capability of the wire will be irreversibly damaged. In most circumstances, except for high field conditions, the niobium tin conduit will fracture before the critical strain is reached.

== Developments and future uses ==
Hafnium or zirconium added to niobium–tin increases the maximum current density in a magnetic field. This may allow it to be used at 16 tesla for CERN's planned Future Circular Collider.

== See also ==
- A15 phases
- Niobium–titanium, more ductile than Nb-Sn
- Particle accelerator
- Superconducting magnet
- Type-II superconductor
