= American Superconductor =

American energy technologies company

American Superconductor Corporation
- Company type: Public
- Traded as: Nasdaq: AMSC; Russell Microcap component
- Industry: Electric power infrastructure
- Founded: April 9, 1987; 39 years ago
- Founder: Gregory J. Yurek
- Headquarters: Ayer, Massachusetts, U.S.
- Key people: Daniel P. McGahn (president & CEO)
- Revenue: ▲$146 million (2023)
- Operating income: ▲ −$11 million (2023)
- Net income: ▲ −$11 million (2023)
- Total assets: ▲$233 million (2023)
- Total equity: ▲$145 million (2023)
- Number of employees: 337 (2024)
- Website: amsc.com

American Superconductor Corporation (AMSC) is an American energy technologies company headquartered in Ayer, Massachusetts. The firm specializes in using superconductors for the development of diverse power systems, including but not limited to superconducting wire. The company operates across three primary business segments: production of high-temperature superconductor (HTS) wire, which has a significantly higher electrical current capacity than copper wire; development of HTS-based motors and generators; and design and manufacturing of power electronic systems for wind farms and transmission systems. AMSC employs superconductors in the construction of ship protection systems. The company has a subsidiary, AMSC Windtec, located in Klagenfurt, Austria.

== History ==
American Superconductor was founded on April 9, 1987, by MIT professor and material scientist Gregory J. Yurek, in his kitchen. The founding team included Yet-Ming Chiang, David A. Rudman and John B. Vander Sande. The company completed its initial public offering in 1991. Over the next twenty years, the company made several acquisitions, including that of the Austrian wind power company WindTec.

== Projects ==
=== Chicago ComEd Resilient Electric Grid Project ===
On Aug 31, 2021 American Superconductor and ComEd announced the successful integration of AMSC’s REG system, which utilizes high-temperature superconductor wire to enhance the reliability, resiliency and performance of the electric power grid. This REG system has been running in commercial service since then. This project was partially funded by Homeland Security as it protects this part of the grid from EMP and other hazards. A second, larger phase is under design.

=== Detroit Edison Project ===
American Superconductor installed a test of a superconducting electric power transmission power cable in the Detroit Edison Frisbee substation in 2001.

=== Holbrook Superconductor Project ===
The world's first production superconducting transmission power cable, the Holbrook Superconductor Project, was commissioned in late June 2008. The suburban Long Island electrical substation is fed by about 600 meters of high-temperature superconductor wire manufactured by American Superconductor, installed underground and chilled to superconducting temperatures with liquid nitrogen.

=== Tres Amigas Project ===
American Superconductor was chosen as a supplier for the Tres Amigas Project, the United States' first renewable energy market hub. The Tres Amigas renewable energy market hub will be a multi-mile, triangular electricity pathway of Superconductor Electricity Pipelines capable of transferring and balancing many gigawatts of power between three U.S. power grids (the Eastern Interconnection, the Western Interconnection and the Texas Interconnection). Unlike traditional powerlines, it will transfer power as DC instead of AC current. It will be located in Clovis, New Mexico.

=== Korea's LS Cable ===
AMSC will sell three million meters of wire to allow LS Cable to build 10–15 miles of superconducting cabling for the grid. This represents an order of magnitude increase over the size of the current largest installation, at Long Island Power.

=== HTS rotors ===
AMSC has demonstrated a 36.5 MW (49,000 horsepower) high-temperature superconductor (HTS) electric motor for the United States Navy, and is developing a similar 10 megawatt wind turbine generator through its wholly owned Austria-based subsidiary AMSC Windtec. This would be one of the world's most powerful turbines. It operates at 30–40 kelvins, and the cooling system uses 40 kW.

== 2009 government stimulus ==
In 2009, the Department of Energy announced that they would provide $4.8M to AMSC for further development of superconducting electrical cables.

== Sinovel controversy ==
In early 2011, a Serbian employee of American Superconductor sold the company's proprietary wind turbine control software to the company's largest customer, China based Sinovel. Sinovel promptly ended its payments to American Superconductor, causing the company to lose 84% of its market cap. The employee was bribed for only $20,500, and later pleaded guilty to bribery charges.
