= List of experimental errors and frauds in physics =

Experimental science demands repeatability of results, but many experiments are not repeatable due to fraud or error. The list of papers whose results were later retracted or discredited, thus leading to invalid science, is growing. Some errors are introduced when the experimenter's desire for a certain result unconsciously influences selection of data (a problem which is possible to avoid in some cases with double-blind protocols). There have also been cases of deliberate scientific misconduct.

== Famous experimental errors ==
- N-rays (1903)

A reported faint visual effect that experimenters could still "see" even when the supposed causative element in their apparatus had been secretly disconnected.

- Claimed experimental disproof of special relativity (1906)

Published in Annalen der Physik and said to be the first journal paper to cite Einstein's 1905 electrodynamics paper. Walter Kaufmann stated that his results were not compatible with special relativity. According to Gerald Holton, it took a decade for the shortcomings of Kaufmann's test to be realised: during this time, critics of special relativity were able to claim that the theory was invalidated by the available experimental evidence. However, in 1906 and 1907, Planck had already published his own conclusion on the behavior of the inertial mass of electrons with high speeds. He had showed that Kaufmann's results are not fully decisive and would lead to superluminal velocities.

- Premature verification of the gravitational redshift effect (1924)

A number of earlier experimenters claimed to have found the presence or lack of gravitational redshift, but Walter Sydney Adams's result was supposed to have settled the issue. Unfortunately, the measurement and the prediction were both in error such that it initially appeared to be valid. It is no longer considered credible and there has been much debate about whether the results were fraud or that his data may have been contaminated by stray light from Sirius A. The first "reliable" confirmations of the effect appeared in the 1960s.

- First reproducible synthetic diamond (1955)

Originally reported in Nature in 1955 and later. Diamond synthesis was later determined to be impossible with the apparatus. Subsequent analysis indicated that the first gemstone (used to secure further funding) was natural rather than synthetic. Artificial diamonds have since been produced.

- Claimed detection of gravitational waves (1970)

In 1970, Joseph Weber, an electrical engineer turned physicist and working with the University of Maryland, reported the detection of 311 excitations on his test equipment designed to measure gravitational waves. He utilized an apparatus consisting of two one-ton aluminum bars, each a separate detector, in some configurations being hung within a vacuum chamber, or having one bar displaced to Argonne National Laboratory near Chicago, about 1,000 kilometers away, all for further isolation. He took extreme measures to isolate the equipment from seismic and other interferences, but Weber's criteria for data analysis turned out to be ill-defined and partly subjective. In 1974, the first indirect detection of gravitational waves was confirmed from observations of a binary pulsar, but by the end of the 1970s, Weber's work was considered spurious as it could not be replicated by others. Still, Weber is considered one of the fathers of gravitational wave detection and inspiration for other projects such as LIGO, which made the first direct observation of gravitational waves in 2015.

- Oops-Leon particle (1976)

Data from Fermilab in 1976 appeared to indicate a new particle at about 6 GeV which decayed into electron-positron pairs. Subsequent data and analysis indicated that the apparent peak resulted from random noise. The name is a pun on upsilon, the proposed name for the new particle and Leon M. Lederman, the principal investigator. The illusory particle is unrelated to the Upsilon meson, discovered in 1977 by the same group.

- Cold fusion (1989)

Since the announcement of Pons and Fleischmann in 1989, cold fusion has been considered to be an example of a pathological science. Two panels convened by the US Department of Energy, one in 1989 and a second in 2004, did not recommend a dedicated federal program for cold fusion research. In 2007, Nature reported that the American Chemical Society would host an invited symposium on cold fusion and low energy nuclear reactions at their national meeting for the first time in many years.

- Neutrinoless double beta decay (2001)

Members of the Heidelberg–Moscow collaboration claimed to have discovered neutrino-less double beta decay in ^{76}Ge in 2001.

- Faster-than-light neutrino anomaly (2011)

In 2011, the OPERA experiment at CERN mistakenly measured neutrinos appearing to travel faster than the speed of light. The results were published in September, noting that further investigation into systematics would be necessary. This investigation found an improperly connected fibre optic cable and a clock oscillator ticking too fast, which together had caused an underestimate of uncertainty in the initial measurement.

- Cosmic microwave background polarization (2014)

On March 17, 2014, astrophysicists of the BICEP2 collaboration announced the detection of inflationary gravitational waves in the B-mode power spectrum, which if confirmed, would provide clear experimental evidence for the cosmological theory of inflation. However, on 19 June 2014, lowered confidence in confirming the cosmic inflation findings was reported. Eventually, the initial findings were revealed to be artifacts of interstellar dust.

- Room-temperature superconductivity in LK-99 (2023)

In July 2023, a team at Korea University led by Lee Sukbae and Kim Ji-Hoon announced the discovery of LK-99, a supposed room-temperature superconductor based on lead apatite doped with copper. As evidence, they published conductivity measurements and a video showing partial levitation that the researchers claimed displayed the Meissner effect. Other research groups were not able to replicate the results and suggested that impurities in the material led to spurious effects mimicking phenomena associated with superconductivity. Copper(I) sulfide, a compound produced in the synthesis process, turned out to be a close match for the claimed properties of LK-99, and pure samples of LK-99 were insulators rather than any form of conductor.

== Alleged scientific misconduct cases ==
- Photon wave–particle duality using canal-ray experiments (1926)

Emil Rupp had been considered one of the best experimenters of his time until he was forced to admit that his notable track record was at least partly due to the fabrication of results.

- Water memory (1988)

French immunologist Jacques Benveniste published a paper in Nature which seemed to support a mechanism by which homeopathy could operate. The journal editors accompanied the paper with an editorial urging readers to "suspend judgement" until the results could be replicated. Benveniste's results failed to have been replicated in subsequent double blind experiments.

- Organic molecular semiconductors (~1999)

A succession of high-profile peer-reviewed papers previously published by Jan Hendrik Schön were subsequently found to have used obviously fabricated data.

- Early production of element 118 (1999)

Element 118 (oganesson) was announced, and then the announcement withdrawn by Berkeley after claims of irreproducibility. The researcher involved, Victor Ninov, denies doing anything wrong.

- Sonofusion (2002)

In 2002, nuclear engineer Rusi Taleyarkhan and his collaborators claimed to have observed evidence of sonofusion or bubble fusion. An investigation in 2008 by Purdue University review board judged him guilty of research misconduct for "falsification of the research record".

- Room-temperature superconductivity (2020-2023)

In various papers Ranga P. Dias and collaborators claimed to have discovered the first room-temperature superconductors using materials like carbonaceous sulfur hydride. Dias was found guilty of scientific misconduct, including data fabrication. The papers were retracted.

== See also ==
- Academic dishonesty
- List of scientific misconduct incidents
- List of topics characterized as pseudoscience
- Bogdanov affair
