= Liposome extruder =

Lab equipment

A liposome extruder is a device that prepares cell membranes, exosomes and also generates nanoscale liposome formulations. The liposome extruder employs the track-etched membrane to filter huge particles and achieve sterile filtration.

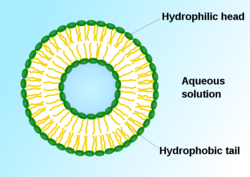
Schematic of a monolamellar liposome.

== Function ==
A liposome is made up of phospholipid bilayers, with the liposome being a spherical vesicle. Phospholipid bilayers have both hydrophobic and hydrophilic properties, which are important characteristics of cell membranes. The hydrophobic ends of phospholipid molecules are constrained, often to each other, creating spherical liposomes that are smaller when the hydrophobic ends are exposed to a solution that is aqueous in nature. The preparation of liposomes results in the formation of the liposome extruder. A liposome extruder is characterized by the uniform, narrow size distribution of its output, and has a particle-size control mechanism that is highly precise. Complex, toxic, injectable products such as the antifungal liposomal Amphotericin B, or the liposomal cytotoxic anticancer agents doxorubicin, paclitaxel, irinotecan, Adriamycin, and cytarabine contain liposomes which are prepared using the liposome extruder.

The technology for extruding liposomes relies on the performance and structural characteristics of the lipid bilayers in the liposomal phospholipids. An external extrusion force pushes the vesicles of liposomes that are large through the polycarbonate membranes with pore sizes that are specific when the transition temperature of the phospholipids rises slightly due to the change in operating temperature. Re-polymerization of the multiple compartments pr liposomes that are large in particle size occurs, and smaller liposomes are created due to the rupturing of the membrane pores. Extrusion of liposomes occurs at a uniform size, based on the pore size in the polycarbonate membrane. This happens when the big vesicles are passed through the cell membrane with a nanopore size specified in size several times due to the extrusion of polycarbonate membranes having uniform and vertical nanopore distribution on the surface of the membrane.

== Application ==
Liposome extruders are applied in the formulation of liposomes of homogeneous size distributions.

== Types ==
=== Hand-Driven liposome extruders ===
This type of liposome extruder is primarily used in research laboratories, as it can process mini-sample volumes between 0.25 ml and 2.5 ml. The hand-driven liposome extruders are further categorized into liposome extruders with a thermal-jacketed option and liposome extruders under ambient temperature. They are operated by manually by pushing a plunger. Liposome extruders under ambient temperature can be fitted with a cooling jacket to regulate temperatures during liposome extrusion.

=== Jacketed liposome extruders ===
Jacketed liposome extruders are applied in laboratories and in pilot-scale research phases. They process volumes between 2 mL and 3 L. The jacketed extruders are fitted with barrels to regulate the temperatures of the samples. To drive this extruder, a compressed nitrogen cylinder is used.

=== Online liposome extruders ===
Online liposome extruders process volumes of between 2 ml and 20L. They are driven by a high-pressure electric pump, making them appropriate for use in pilot-scale liposome production.

=== Multiple liposome extruder system ===
A multiple liposome extruder system is fitted with pressure and temperature sensors and a control panel to regulate liposome production. it processes capacities of between 1L and 200L.

== Gallery ==
Types of liposome extruders

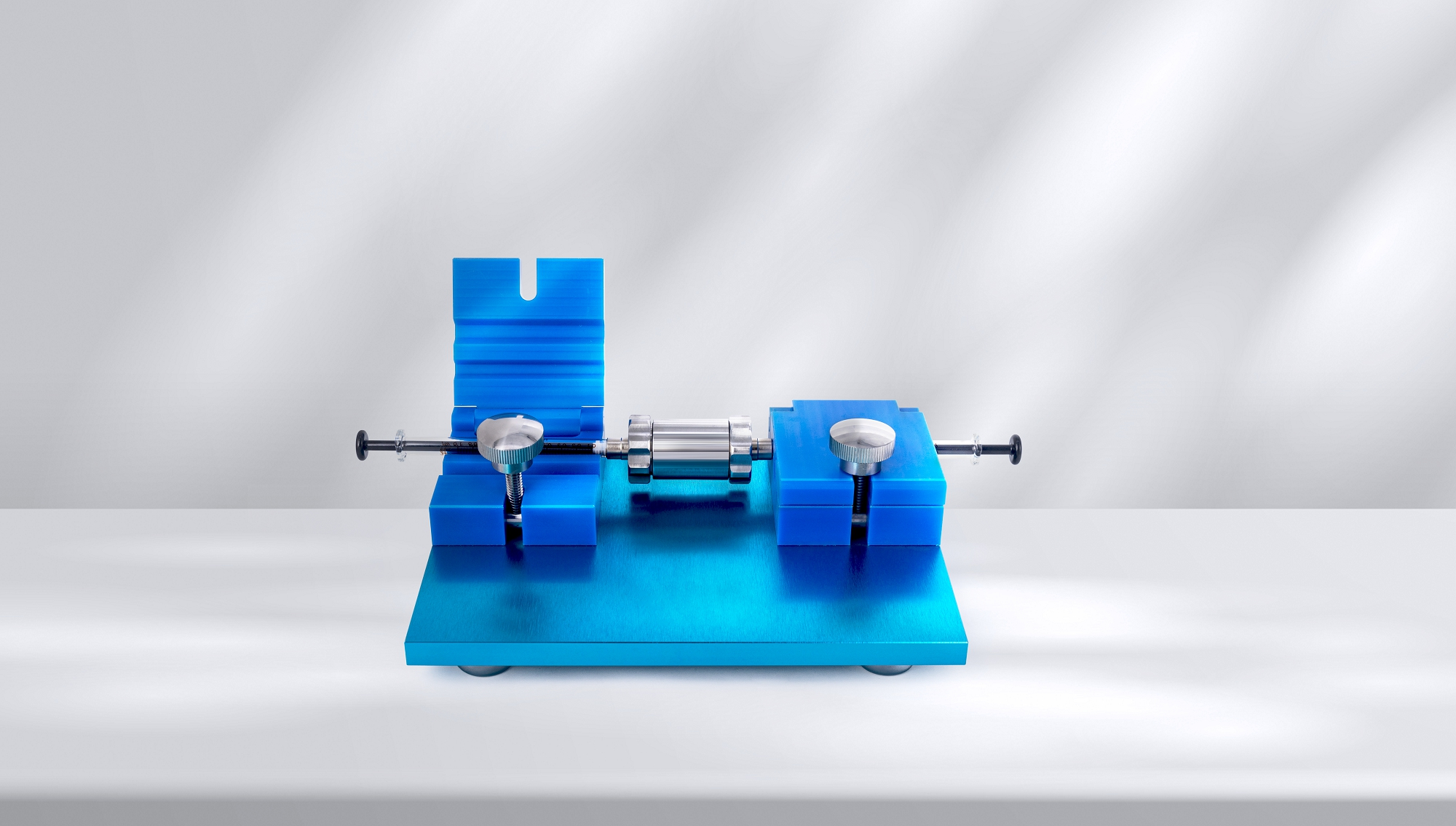
Hand-driven Liposome Extruder

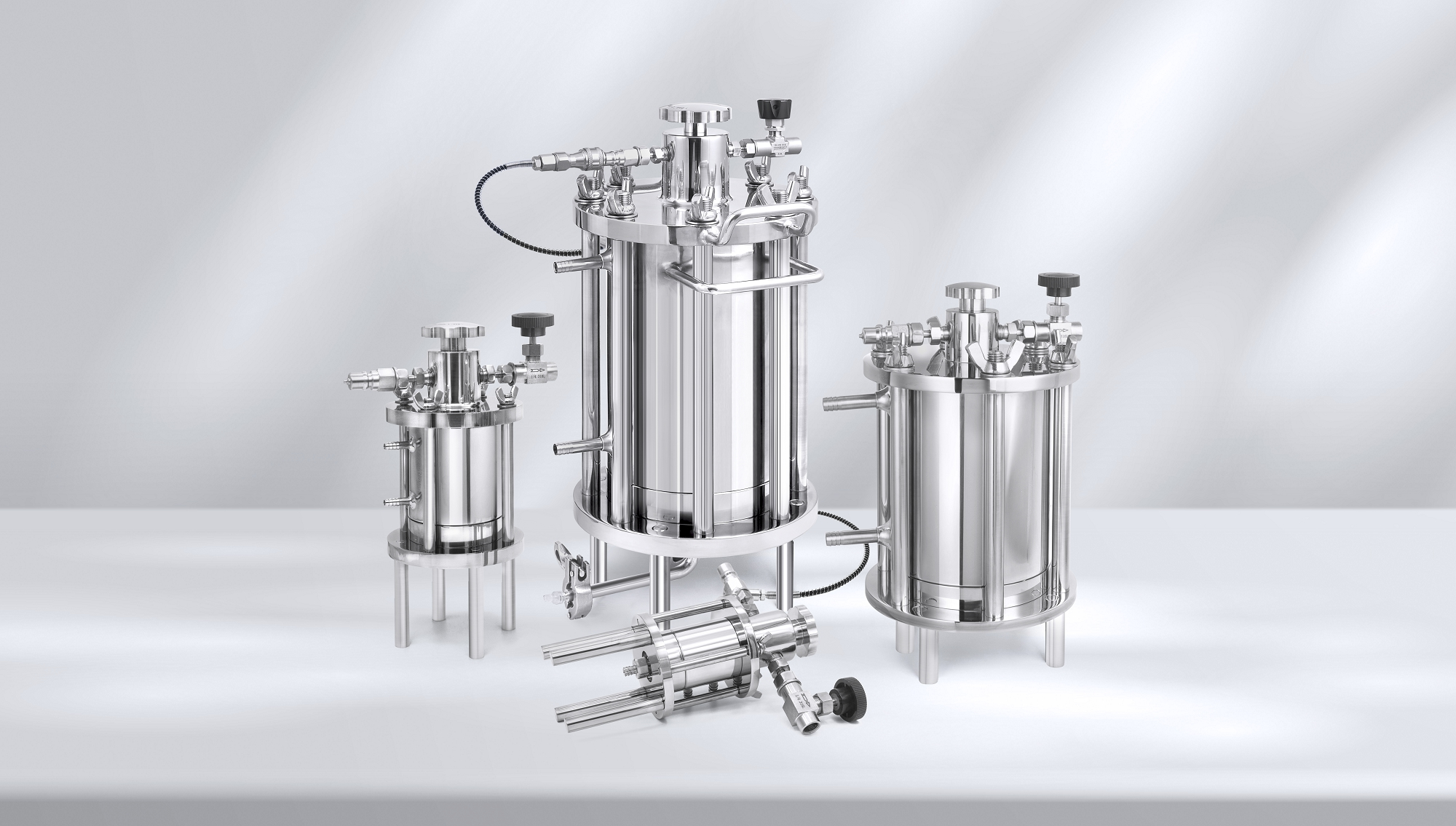
Jacketed liposome extruders

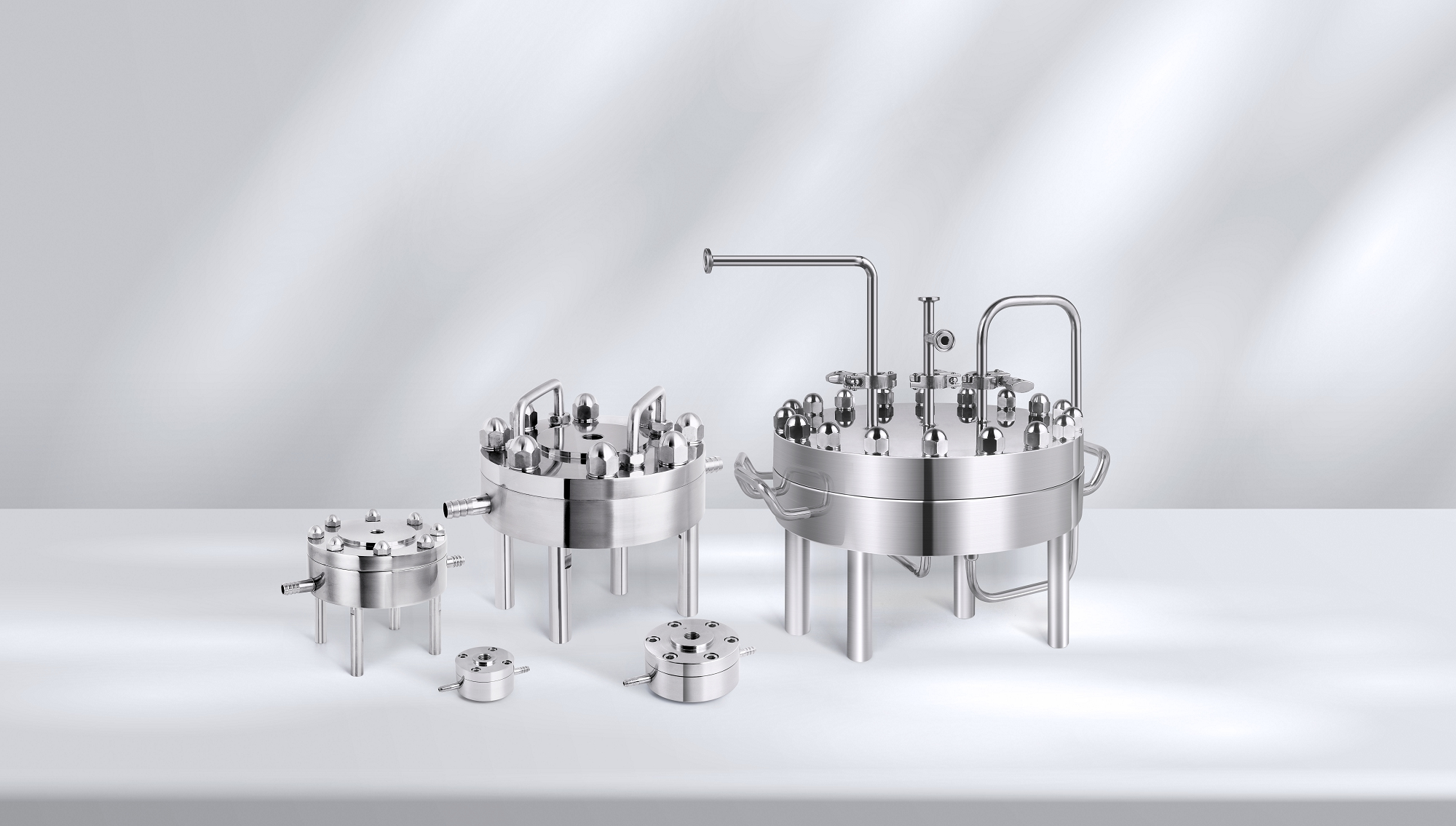
Online liposome extruders
