= Paranematic susceptibility =

In the study of liquid crystals the paranematic susceptibility (Latin: susceptibilis "receptiveness") is a quantity that describes the degree of induced order in a liquid crystal in response to an applied magnetic field. As a result of the diamagnetic anisotropy of liquid crystal molecules, nematic order can be produced by the application of a magnetic field. If a magnetic field is applied to a nematic liquid crystal in the isotropic phase then the order is given by:

$$\langle P_2\rangle=\eta\mathbf{H}^2$$

The proportionality constant $\eta$ is the paranematic susceptibility. The value increases as the liquid crystal is cooled towards its transition temperature. In both the mean field approximation and Landau-deGennes theory the paranematic susceptibility is proportional to $(T-T^*_C)^{-1}$ where $T^*_C$ is the transition temperature.
