= Q-Centre =

Q-Centre can refer to the following:

- The Q Centre in British Columbia
- Q-Centre, a materials research firm in Korea associated with, and holding the trademark on, the claimed superconductor LK-99
