= Metallization =

Metalization may refer to one of a number of different processes:

- Coating a covering applied an object's surface that improves surface properties: adhesion, resistance to corrosion or wear or scratches.
- Metallizing (also metalize) to coat, treat, or combine with a metal.
- Thermal spraying melted (or heated) materials are sprayed onto a surface.
- Vacuum deposition is a family of processes used to deposit layers as thin as one atom to millimeters thick in a vacuum.
- Vacuum metallizing the metallic coating of an object takes place in a vacuum chamber.
- Vacuum coating a mechanized process for applying coatings to lengths of materials.
- Insulator–metal transition, the change of a material from a non-metallic state to a metallic state due to the closure of a bandgap or a change in allotrope
- Metallization pressure, the pressure at which a nonmetallic substance undergoes an insulator–metal transition
- Metalation, the class of reactions forming a metal–nonmetal bond, typically in organometallic chemistry
