= Sinéad Griffin =

Irish physicist (born 1986)

- Born: 20 July 1986 (age 40); Dublin, Ireland
- Education: University of California, Santa Barbara; ETH Zurich; Imperial College London; Trinity College, Dublin
- Scientific career
- Fields: Condensed matter theory Materials Science
- Workplaces: Lawrence Berkeley National Laboratory
- Thesis: From the Early Universe to the Hubbard Hamiltonian in the Hexagonal Manganites
- Doctoral advisor: Nicola Spaldin

Sinéad Majella Griffin (born 20 July 1986) is an Irish physicist working at Lawrence Berkeley National Laboratory on condensed matter physics and materials science. She won the 2017 Swiss Physical Society Award in General Physics.

== Early life ==
Griffin was born in 1986 in Rush, County Dublin, Ireland.

== Education ==
Griffin studied physics at Trinity College, Dublin, graduating in 2008 with a bachelor's degree in theoretical physics. She moved to Imperial College London for her master's studies, working with Ray Rivers on topological defects in condensed matter and cosmology. She worked at the University of California, Santa Barbara, for her doctoral studies, studying superconductors and spintronics with Nicola Spaldin. When Nicola Spaldin joined ETH Zurich, Griffin accompanied her, earning a PhD, in 2014 looking at the Hubbard model for hexagonal manganites. During her PhD she tested the Kibble–Zurek mechanism in YMnO_{3}. She won the 2015 Materials and Processes (MaP) Award for the best interdisciplinary thesis at ETH Zurich.

== Career ==
In 2015 Griffin joined Jeffrey Neaton's laboratory at Lawrence Berkeley National Laboratory. She recognized that multiferroic hexagonal manganites exhibited the same symmetry as those proposed shortly after the Big Bang, testing phenomena that occur on galactic scales with those that occur in a laboratory. Her work explored symmetry-breaking conditions that lead to topological defects. Griffin has also worked on materials for high-energy physics experiments.

In 2023, she won the Early Career Scientist Prize in Computational Physics from the International Union of Pure and Applied Physics. In the same year, Griffin published an arXiv preprint, presenting density functional theory augmented with a on-site Hubbard-like model (i.e., DFT+U) calculations of Cu-substituted lead phosphate apatite (i.e., suspected structure of LK-99), identifying correlated isolated flat bands at the Fermi level, a debated signature of superconductors. Per the author, this work did not show that LK-99 is a superconductor at room temperature, but suggested the possibility of a room temperature superconductivity. Her findings propose a simplified two-band model for understanding this behavior in LK-99, and potentially other superconductors. Similar theory preprints by other academics and researchers did not entirely agree with Griffin's results.
