= Ranga Dias (physicist) =

Sri Lankan condensed matter physicist

- Born: Liyanagamage Ranganath Prabashwara Dias; Sri Lanka
- Education: Washington State University; University of Colombo
- Scientific career
- Fields: Superconductivity
- Workplaces: University of Rochester; Harvard University
- Thesis: Phase Transitions, Metallization, Superconductivity and Magnetic Ordering in Dense Carbon Disulfide and Chemical Analogs (2013)
- Doctoral advisor: Choong-shik Yoo

Liyanagamage Ranganath Prabashwara Dias, known as Rang Dias, is a scientist with a primary interest in condensed matter physics. He was an assistant professor in the departments of Mechanical Engineering and Physics and Astronomy at the University of Rochester (UR), and a scientist at the UR Laboratory for Laser Energetics. As of November 19, 2024, he was no longer employed at UR.

In 2020 and in 2023, his group published two papers claiming to have achieved room-temperature superconductivity, the first using carbonaceous sulfur hydride at extremely high pressure, and the second using nitrogen-doped lutetium hydride at near-ambient pressure. Both papers were later retracted after accusations of scientific misconduct, including data fabrication and manipulation. Dias denied those charges, with an initial investigation by UR in 2021 reporting no evidence of misconduct. A later independent investigation performed by the American Physical Society did find such evidence, and a March 2024 investigation by the University reported that Dias "engaged in research misconduct."

As of 2025, Dias and his collaborator Ashkan Salamat at University of Nevada, Las Vegas have had five of their research papers retracted, and five other papers have received an Expression of Concern by the publishers.

Dias founded a company related to his superconductivity interests, Unearthly Materials, which made misleading claims about its funding and investors.

== Early life and education ==
Liyanagamage Ranganath Prabashwara Dias was born into a middle-class family in Kottawa, Sri Lanka. He is the eldest of three children, and has a younger brother and sister. He completed elementary school at the St. Joseph's Boys' College, Nugegoda, middle school at the President's College, Maharagama, and high school studies at the Royal College, Colombo.

He received his B.S. in physics from the University of Colombo in 2006. In 2013, he obtained his Ph.D. in physics from Washington State University, where he studied under Professor Choong-shik Yoo. After his Ph.D., he was hired by Professor Isaac Silvera at the Department of Physics, Harvard University, to research metallic hydrogen.

In January 2017, together with Silvera, Dias (then a postdoctoral fellow at Harvard University) reported the creation of solid metallic hydrogen using a diamond anvil cell. This state of hydrogen was originally predicted by Eugene Wigner and Hillard Bell Huntington in 1935, since which scientists have been trying to make the substance. However, several physicists expressed skepticism about the result.

== Career ==
In 2017, Dias became an assistant professor in both the Department of Mechanical Engineering and the Department of Physics and Astronomy at the University of Rochester.

Dias's research focuses on properties of materials at extreme pressure and temperature conditions. These materials exhibit fundamental changes in their properties, potentially leading to the discovery of novel phenomena and exotic states of matter that do not exist under normal conditions. He is particularly interested in high-temperature superconductivity and quantum phase transitions of hydrogen and hydride materials. His research utilizes a diamond anvil cell and lasers to achieve extreme pressure and temperatures in materials.

In 2021, he was named as an innovation leader in the Time 100 Next list.

As of November 19, 2024, he was no longer employed at the University of Rochester.

== Scientific misconduct investigations ==
As of 2024, five of Dias's papers have been retracted, all with a small cohort of coauthors. An extensive Research Misconduct Investigation, conducted by the University of Rochester at the request of the National Science Foundation, uncovered multiple evidence for Research Misconduct, including verbatim text and figure plagiarism in a NSF grant application and multiple instances of data falsification and fabrication. A Nature News article revealed that while the report was initially confidential, it became public in court documents.

=== Published peer-reviewed works ===
Dias's research into room temperature superconductivity and metallic hydrogen has been the subject of controversy and scrutiny due to concerns regarding data availability, data analysis methods, and lack of reproducibility.

In 2020, Dias published a paper in Nature describing room-temperature superconductivity in a carbonaceous sulfur hydride. When asked about a potential Nobel Prize for this discovery, Dias said: "Yes, this has a potential for such high recognition, but I do not believe this will happen in the near future." It was retracted by Nature in 2022. Condensed matter theorist Jorge E. Hirsch was the first to question peculiarities in the published data. Marvin L. Cohen, National Medal of Science recipient and former president of the American Physical Society, was also an early voice pointing out problems with the carbonaceous sulfur hydride paper.

After the paper was retracted, Dias and co-author Ashkan Salamat denied accusations of misconduct. Initial investigations by the University of Rochester found no evidence to support the accusations, but in 2024 they found Dias had engaged in research misconduct.

In 2022, James Hamlin, a physicist at the University of Florida, alleged that Dias may have copied data in a 2021 paper from an experiment on a different material in his 2013 Ph.D. thesis. Coauthor Ashkan Salamat denied accusations of wrongdoing in an interview. However, the journal Physical Review Letters subsequently added an 'expression of concern' to the paper, and is conducting an investigation. Hamlin discovered the similarity between the figures while following up on his discovery that Dias had plagiarized part of that thesis from Hamlin's own Ph.D. thesis.

In April 2023, a comment on another of Dias's papers in the journal ChemComm (which was said to be a partial replication of his CSH superconductivity results) was published. The comment says that:

"with probability larger than 1–10^{−338} some of those data were not measured in a laboratory, contrary to what the papers claim. This finding undermines confidence in the claim that any of the experimental evidence reported in those papers reflects the properties of real physical samples of CSH."

On July 25, 2023, it was announced that a 2021 paper in Physical Review Letters (PRL) on which Dias was a co-author would be retracted due to suspected data fabrication. The journal commissioned an investigation by four independent referees and concluded that "The findings back up the allegations of data fabrication/falsification convincingly". Two of the referees reported on "a very disturbing picture of apparent data fabrication followed by an attempt to hide or coverup [sic] the fact. We urge immediate retraction of the paper". The PRL retraction said that "Dias stands by the data in Fig. 1(b) and does not agree to retract the Letter". He was the only author to do so, and all other authors agreed to the retraction. He responded that some errors in charts were unintentionally introduced in Adobe Illustrator by his colleagues. One of the reviewers hired by PRL to conduct an independent review said Dias's response was "both inadequate and disappointing", adding that Adobe Illustrator was never mentioned in the discussions among the authors, Hamlin, and PRL's editors that were provided to the reviewers. The University of Rochester spokesperson said the university "has a comprehensive investigation underway into the questions raised about the integrity of all data at issue in this and other studies".

On September 26, 2023, The Wall Street Journal reported that the coauthors of the N-doped lutetium hydride Nature paper were requesting a retraction, alleging Dias of misrepresenting data. He denied the allegation and said he did not agree to retract. On November 7, 2023 Nature formally retracted the paper in question, with the statement indicating that "... request of the authors Nathan Dasenbrock-Gammon, Elliot Snider, Raymond McBride, Hiranya Pasan, Dylan Durkee, Sachith E. Dissanayake, Keith V. Lawler and Ashkan Salamat." The retraction note states that the remaining authors "Nugzari Khalvashi-Sutter, Sasanka Munasinghe and Ranga P. Dias have not stated whether they agree or disagree with this retraction."

Commenting in Physics World about Dias and the controversy surrounding his superconductivity work, physicist Lilia Boeri said his "inconsiderate behaviour has harmed the reputation of the field". James Hamlin said, "I do think the whole saga is damaging to science in general, and superconductivity research more so, and more broadly it's fuel for anti-science types."

In 2024, a news report in Nature noted that " Dias is now infamous for the scandal that surrounds his work," that "many other research groups have tried and failed to replicate Dias's superconductivity results," revealed that the University of Rochester had "launched a fourth investigation, led by experts external to the university [following which] Dias was stripped of his students and laboratories," and "the evidence raises questions about why the problems in Dias's lab did not prompt stronger action, and sooner, by his collaborators, by Nature's journal team and by his university."

=== Unearthly Materials ===
In 2020, Dias and Salamat formed a start up company called Unearthly Materials, intended to commercially exploit patents held by Dias and the University of Rochester related to Dias' alleged discoveries of high temperature superconductivity.

In March 2023, a reporter for Quanta Magazine found a 2021 YouTube talk in which Dias claimed that Unearthly Materials had raised $20 million and listed investors that included the CEOs of OpenAI and Spotify. A representative for Dias then retracted the claims of both the funding and the investors, saying they were "aspirational".

=== 2013, Washington State University, Ph.D. thesis ===
In April 2023, the journal Science reported at least 21% of Dias's 2013 doctoral thesis, supervised at Washington State University, had been identified as copied from uncredited sources, including the 2007 doctoral thesis of James Hamlin, at Washington University in St. Louis, in addition to parts of a 1999 paper of Dias's PhD adviser, Choong-Shik Yoo. Analysis of Dias's thesis by Lisa Rasmussen, a research ethicist at the University of North Carolina, Charlotte, also indicated plagiarism.

== See also ==
- List of scientific misconduct incidents
