= Lead apatite =

Lead apatite is a generic name for apatite-structure materials that contain lead as the divalent cation. A Copper-doped lead-apatite has been proposed as a room-temperature superconductor. A number of minerals are known. All have a hexagonal crystal structure.

== Minerals ==
name	formula	unit cell Å	a : c	volume	density	reference	
Fluorpyromorphite	Pb_{5}(PO_{4})_{3}F	a = 9.779 c = 7.241	1 : 0.74	599.68			
Pyromorphite	Pb_{5}(PO_{4})_{3}Cl	a = 9.987 c = 7.33	1 : 0.734	633.15	7.04		
Hydroxylpyromorphite	Pb_{5}(PO_{4})_{3}OH	a = 9.787 c = 7.307	1: 0.747	606.13	7.32		
Oxypyromorphite	Pb_{10}(PO_{4})_{6}O						
Mimetite	Pb_{5}(AsO_{4})_{3}Cl	a = 10.250 c = 7.454	1 : 0.727	678.22	7.24		
	Pb_{5}(AsO_{4})_{3}OH	a = 10.1266 c = 7.5010	1 : 0.741	666.16			
Vanadinite	Pb_{5}(VO_{4})_{3}Cl	a = 10.3174 c = 7.3378	1 : 0.711	676.45	6.88		
Germanate-pyromorphite	Pb_{5}(PO_{4})_{2}GeO_{4}						
Phosphohedyphane	Ca_{2}Pb_{3}(PO_{4})_{3}Cl	a = 9.857 Å, c = 7.13	1 : 0.723	599.9	5.92		
Hedyphane	Ca_{2}Pb_{3}(AsO_{4})_{3}Cl	a = 10.14 c = 7.185	1 : 0.798	639.78	5.82		
Hydroxylhedyphane	Ca_{2}Pb_{3}(AsO_{4})_{3}(OH)	a = 10.0414 c = 7.2752	1 : 0.725	635.28			?
Vanackerite	Pb_{4}Cd(AsO_{4})_{3}Cl	a = 10.0279 c = 7.2965	1 : 0.728	635.43	7.28		
