= Carbonaceous sulfur hydride =

Superconducting chemical substance

Identifiers

Properties
Chemical formula	CH_{8}S
Molar mass	52.14 g·mol^{−1}
- Except where otherwise noted, data are given for materials in their standard state (at 25 °C [77 °F], 100 kPa). Infobox references

Carbonaceous sulfur hydride (CSH) is a potential superconductor that was announced in October 2020 by the lab of Ranga Dias at the University of Rochester, in a Nature paper that was later retracted. It was reported to have a superconducting transition temperature of 15 °C (59 °F) at a pressure of 267 GPa (38.7 million psi), which would have made it the highest-temperature superconductor discovered. The paper faced criticism due to its non-standard data analysis calling into question its conclusions, and in September 2022 it was retracted by Nature. In July 2023 a second paper by the authors was retracted from Physical Review Letters due to suspected data fabrication, and in September 2023 a third paper by the authors about N-doped lutetium hydride was retracted from Nature.

CSH is an uncharacterized ternary polyhydride compound of carbon, sulfur and hydrogen with a chemical formula that is thought to be CH_{8}S. Measurements under extreme pressure are difficult, and in particular the elements are too light for an X-ray determination of crystal structure (X-ray crystallography).

== Background ==
Prior to 1911, all known electrical conductors exhibited electrical resistance, due to collisions of the charge carrier with atoms in the material. Researchers discovered that in certain materials at low temperatures, the charge carriers interact with phonons in the material and form Cooper pairs, as described by BCS theory. This process results in the formation of a superconductor, with zero electrical resistance. During the transition to the superconducting state, the magnetic field lines are expelled from the interior of the material, which allows for the possibility of magnetic levitation. The effect has historically been known to occur at only low temperatures, but researchers have spent decades attempting to find a material that could operate at room temperature.

== Synthesis ==
The material is a ternary polyhydride compound of carbon, sulfur and hydrogen with a chemical formula that is thought to be CH_{8}S. As of October 2020, the material's molecular structure remains uncharacterized, as extreme pressures and the light elements used are unsuitable for most measurements, such as X-ray determination.

The material was reportedly synthesized by compressing methane (CH_{4}), hydrogen sulfide (H_{2}S) and hydrogen (H_{2}) in a diamond anvil cell and illuminating with a 532 nm green laser. A starting compound of carbon and sulfur is synthesized with a 1:1 molar ratio, formed into balls less than five microns in diameter, and placed into a diamond anvil cell. Hydrogen gas is then added and the system is compressed to 4.0 GPa (0.58 million psi) and illuminated with a 532 nm laser for several hours. It was reported that the crystal is not stable under 10 GPa (1.5 million psi) and can be destroyed if left at room temperature overnight. Other researchers were skeptical that such materials could serve as room temperature superconductors, as the absence of van Hove singularities or similar peaks in the electronic density of states of more than 3000 candidate phases rules out conventional superconductivity.

== Claims of superconductivity ==
Superconductivity for sulfur hydrides without carbon was first reported in 2015.

On 14 October 2020, a paper by Elliot Snider, et al. from the Dias lab was published, claiming that carbonaceous sulfur hydride was a room-temperature superconductor. Two years later, the paper was retracted. The claims in the paper included a superconducting state at temperatures as high as 15 °C (59 °F), almost 30 °C (86 °F) higher than the existing record holder for high-temperature superconductivity. This state was claimed to be observable only at the very high pressure of 267 GPa (38.7 million psi), a million times the pressure in a typical car tire. The report was published in Nature and received significant media coverage.

=== Criticism and retraction ===
The validity of these results was called into question by Jorge E. Hirsch as well as others. Unavailability of the data prompted an editor's note on the original paper. additional criticism focused on the measurements of AC susceptibility used to test the superconductivity as the more definitive Meissner effect was too hard to observe at the scale of the experiments.

As of 2022, no other lab had been able to reproduce the result, and the criticisms of the data analysis in the paper had not been addressed. On February 15, 2022, Nature added a cautionary Editor's Note to the article, and on 26 September 26, 2022, retracted the article entirely. By the end of 2023 two other papers from the lab had been retracted from Physical Review Letters and Nature, due to suspicions of data fabrication. At this point other publications by the lab were scrutinized more closely and as of March 2024 a total of nine of their papers had been retracted.
