= Fluorellestadite =

Nesosilicate mineral

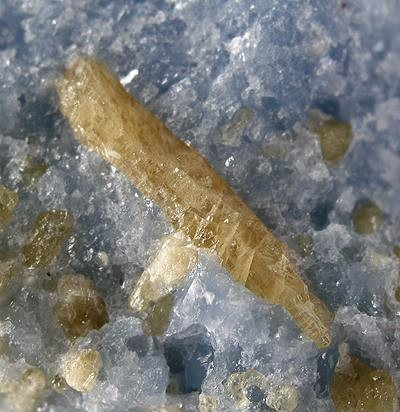
- Fluorellestadite on blue calcite from the Crestmore Quarries, California, US

General
- Category: Nesosilicates; Apatite structural group
- Formula: Ca_{10}(SiO_{4})_{3}(SO_{4})_{3}F_{2}
- IMA symbol: Fel
- Strunz classification: 9.AH.25 (10 ed); 8/B.27-10 (8 ed)
- Dana classification: 52.04.09.03
- Crystal system: Hexagonal
- Crystal class: Dipyramidal (6/m); H-M symbol: (6/m)
- Space group: P6_{3}/m

Identification
- Formula mass: 503.55 g/mol
- Color: Light red, yellow, bluish green or colorless
- Crystal habit: Acicular or hexagonal prismatic crystals, and fine-grained aggregates
- Cleavage: Imperfect on {0001}
- Fracture: Conchoidal
- Tenacity: Very brittle
- Mohs scale hardness: 4 1/2
- Luster: Sub-resinous to vitreous
- Streak: White with a weak bluish tint
- Diaphaneity: Transparent to translucent
- Specific gravity: 3.03 to 3.07
- Optical properties: Uniaxial (-)
- Refractive index: n_{ω} = 1.638(2), n_{ε} = 1.632(2); n_{ω} = 1.655, n_{ε} = 1.650
- Solubility: Easily soluble in dilute hydrochloric and nitric acids
- Other characteristics: Sometimes fluorescent. Not radioactive.

Fluorellestadite is a rare nesosilicate of calcium, with sulfate and fluorine, with the chemical formula Ca_{10}(SiO_{4})_{3}(SO_{4})_{3}F_{2}. It is a member of the apatite group, and forms a series with hydroxylellestadite.

== Etymology ==
The mineral was originally named wilkeite by Eakle and Rogers in 1914, in honor of R. M. Wilke, a mineral collector and dealer. In 1922, a sample of “wilkeite” was analysed and found to be sufficiently different from the material reported by Eakle and Rogers to consider it a new species. The name “ellestadite” was proposed, in honor of Reuben B Ellestad (1900–1993), an American analytic chemist from the Laboratory for Rock Analysis, University of Minnesota, US.

In 1982 Rouse and Dunn showed that the Si:S ratio was close to 1:1, giving the formula Ca_{10}(SiO_{4})_{3}(SO_{4})_{3}X_{2}, where X represents fluorine (F), hydroxyl (OH) or chlorine (Cl), and they named minerals in this group the ellestadite group. The end members of the group were named hydroxylellestadite (X = OH), fluorellestadite (X = F) and chlorellestadite (X = Cl); ideal end-member chlorellestadite is assumed not to exist in nature, although it has been synthesized. Wilkeite was discredited as a unique species, as it is not an end member of any solid solution series, but an intermediate member.

The name fluorellestadite was changed to ellestadite-(F) in 2008 and changed back to fluorellestadite in 2010.

== Structure ==
The ellestadites are nesosilicates, which are minerals with isolated SiO_{4} tetrahedra. They are members of the apatite group, but whereas phosphorus is one of the chief constituents of apatite, in ellestadite it is almost completely replaced by sulfur and silicon, without appreciably altering the structure. The crystal class is hexagonal 6/m, space group P6_{3}/m. The tetrahedral groups are arranged to create the 6_{3} screw axis, and the fluorine atoms are located in channels parallel to this direction. Some sources give unit cell parameters for one formula unit per unit cell (Z = 1), but some scientists consider the formula to be half the value accepted by the International Mineralogical Association (IMA), i.e. Ca_{5}((Si,S)O_{4}))_{3}F, with two formula units per unit cell (Z = 2). Cell parameters for natural, as opposed to synthetic, material are a = 9.41 to 9.53 Å, and c = 6.90 to 6.94 Å. Rouse and Dunn postulated a hypothetical pure end-member with a = 9.543 Å and c = 6.917 Å. Synthetic material has a = 9.53 to 9.561 Å, and c = 6.91 to 6.920 Å.

== Appearance ==
Fluorellestadite occurs as acicular or hexagonal prismatic, poorly terminated crystals, and as fine-grained aggregates. Crystals are transparent and aggregates are translucent. Material from Crestmore, California, is light rose-red or yellow in color, and typically occurs in a matrix of blue calcite. Material from Russia is pale bluish-green or colorless. The streak is white with a weak bluish tint, and the luster is sub-resinous on broken surfaces, but very brilliant on prism faces.

== Physical properties ==
Fluorellestadite shows imperfect cleavage perpendicular to the long crystal axis. The mineral is very brittle, and breaks with a conchoidal fracture. Its hardness is 4 1/2, between that of fluorite and apatite, and its specific gravity is 3.03 to 3.07, similar to that of fluorite. It is easily soluble in dilute hydrochloric and nitric acids and is not radioactive. When intensely heated, ellestadite (wilkeite) becomes colorless and then assumes a pale bluish green color on cooling.

The mineral is uniaxial (-), with refractive indices n_{ω} = 1.638 to 1.655 and n_{ε} = 1.632 to 1.650. It is sometimes fluorescent, white to blue-white or yellow-white in short-wave ultraviolet light, and medium white-yellow-brown or weak white in long-wave light.

== Occurrence and associations ==
The type locality is Coal Mine No. 44, Kopeisk, Chelyabinsk coal basin, Chelyabinsk Oblast, Southern Urals, Russia, and type material is held at the Fersman Mineralogical Museum, Academy of Sciences, Moscow, Russia. Ellestadite is a skarn mineral. It occurs associated with diopside, wollastonite, idocrase, monticellite, okenite, vesuvianite, calcite and others at Crestmore, Riverside County, California, US. At Crestmore a contact zone exists between crystalline limestone and granodiorite. The area was quarried for limestone in the early 1900s, revealing varied associations of metamorphic minerals, including ellestadite (named as wilkeite) with garnet, vesuvianite and diopside, in blue calcite. At the type locality it was formed in burned fragments of petrified wood in coal dumps, associated with lime, periclase, magnesioferrite, hematite, srebrodolskite and anhydrite. Ellestadite (wilkeite) is often altered to okenite.
