= Iron pentahydride =

Identifiers
CAS Number	2225974-72-9
3D model (JSmol)	Interactive image
- InChI: InChI=1S/Fe.5H Key: HAXLEIPZVOGIBZ-UHFFFAOYSA-N
- SMILES: [Fe].[H].[H].[H].[H].[H]

Properties
Chemical formula	FeH_{5}
Molar mass	60.885 g·mol^{−1}
- Except where otherwise noted, data are given for materials in their standard state (at 25 °C [77 °F], 100 kPa). Infobox references

Iron pentahydride FeH_{5} is a superhydride compound of iron and hydrogen, stable under high pressures. It is important because it contains atomic hydrogen atoms that are not bonded into smaller molecular clusters, and may be a superconductor. Pairs of hydrogen atoms are not bonded together into molecules. FeH_{5} has been made by compressing a flake of iron with hydrogen in a diamond anvil cell to a pressure of 130 GPa and heating to below 1500K. When decompressed to 66 GPa it decomposes to solid FeH_{3}.

The unit cell is tetragonal with space group I4/mmm.

== See also ==
- Iron hydrides
