= Metallic hydrogen =

Phase of hydrogen

Metallic hydrogen is a phase of hydrogen in which it behaves like an electrical conductor. This phase was predicted in 1935 on theoretical grounds by Eugene Wigner and Hillard Bell Huntington.

At high pressure and temperatures, metallic hydrogen can exist as a partial liquid rather than a solid. It is thought to appear in large quantities in the hot and gravitationally compressed interiors of Jupiter and Saturn, as well as in some exoplanets.

== Theoretical predictions ==
A diagram of Jupiter showing a model of the planet's interior, with a rocky core overlaid by a deep layer of liquid metallic hydrogen (shown as magenta) and an outer layer predominantly of molecular hydrogen. Jupiter's true interior composition is uncertain. For instance, the core may have shrunk as convection currents of hot liquid metallic hydrogen mixed with the molten core and carried its contents to higher levels in the planetary interior. Furthermore, there is no clear physical boundary between the hydrogen layers—with increasing depth the gas increases smoothly in temperature and density, ultimately becoming liquid. Features are shown to scale except for the aurorae and the orbits of the Galilean moons.

=== Hydrogen under pressure ===
Though generally placed atop the alkali metal column in the periodic table, hydrogen does not, under ordinary conditions, exhibit the properties of an alkali metal. Instead, it forms diatomic H_{2} molecules, similar to halogens and some nonmetals in the second period of the periodic table, such as nitrogen and oxygen. Diatomic hydrogen is a gas that, at atmospheric pressure, liquefies and solidifies only at very low temperature (20 K and 14 K respectively).

In 1935, physicists Eugene Wigner and Hillard Bell Huntington predicted that under an immense pressure of around 25 GPa (250,000 atm; 3,600,000 psi), hydrogen would display metallic properties: instead of discrete H_{2} molecules (which consist of two electrons bound between two protons), a bulk phase would form with a solid lattice of protons and the electrons delocalized throughout. Since then, producing metallic hydrogen in the laboratory has been described as "the holy grail of high-pressure physics".

The initial prediction about the amount of pressure needed was eventually shown to be too low. Since the first work by Wigner and Huntington, the more modern theoretical calculations point toward higher but potentially achievable metallization pressures of around 400 GPa (3,900,000 atm; 58,000,000 psi).

=== Liquid metallic hydrogen ===
Helium-4 is a liquid at normal pressure near absolute zero, a consequence of its high zero-point energy (ZPE). The ZPE of protons in a dense state is also high, and a decline in the ordering energy (relative to the ZPE) is expected at high pressures. Arguments have been advanced by Neil Ashcroft and others that there is a melting point maximum in compressed hydrogen, but also that there might be a range of densities, at pressures around 400 GPa, where hydrogen would be a liquid metal, even at low temperatures.

Geng predicted that the ZPE of protons indeed lowers the melting temperature of hydrogen to a minimum of 200 to 250 K (−73 to −23 °C) at pressures of 500–1,500 GPa (4,900,000–14,800,000 atm; 73,000,000–218,000,000 psi).

Within this flat region there might be an elemental mesophase intermediate between the liquid and solid state, which could be metastably stabilized down to low temperature and enter a supersolid state.

=== Superconductivity ===
In 1968, Neil Ashcroft suggested that metallic hydrogen might be a superconductor, up to room temperature (290 K or 17 °C). This hypothesis is based on an expected strong coupling between conduction electrons and lattice vibrations.

=== As a rocket propellant ===
Metastable metallic hydrogen may have potential as a highly efficient rocket propellant; the metallic form would be stored, and the energy of its decompression and conversion to the diatomic gaseous form when released through a nozzle used to generate thrust, with a theoretical specific impulse of up to 1700 seconds (for reference, the most efficient chemical rocket propellants flown have an I_{sp} less than 500 s), although a metastable form suitable for mass-production and conventional high-volume storage may not exist. Another significant issue is the heat of the reaction, which, at over 6000 K, is too high for any known engine materials to be used. This would necessitate diluting the metallic hydrogen with water or liquid hydrogen, a mixture that would still provide a significant performance boost over current propellants.

=== Possibility of novel types of quantum fluid ===
Presently known "super" states of matter are superconductors, superfluid liquids and gases, and supersolids. Egor Babaev predicted that if hydrogen and deuterium have liquid metallic states, they might have quantum ordered states that cannot be classified as superconducting or superfluid in the usual sense. Instead, they might represent two possible novel types of quantum fluids: superconducting superfluids and metallic superfluids. Such fluids were predicted to have highly unusual reactions to external magnetic fields and rotations, which might provide a means for experimental verification of Babaev's predictions. It has also been suggested that, under the influence of a magnetic field, hydrogen might exhibit phase transitions from superconductivity to superfluidity and vice versa.

=== Lithium alloying reduces requisite pressure ===
In 2009, Zurek et al. predicted that the alloy LiH_{6} would be a stable metal at only one quarter of the pressure required to metallize hydrogen, and that similar effects should hold for alloys of type LiH_{n} and possibly "other alkali high-hydride systems", i.e. alloys of type XH_{n}, where X is an alkali metal. This was later verified in AcH_{8} and LaH_{10} with T_{c} approaching 270 K leading to speculation that other compounds may even be stable at mere MPa pressures with room-temperature superconductivity.

== Experimental pursuit ==
=== Shock-wave compression, 1996 ===
In March 1996, a group of scientists at Lawrence Livermore National Laboratory reported that they had serendipitously produced the first identifiably metallic hydrogen for about a microsecond at temperatures of thousands of kelvins, pressures of over 100 GPa (1,000,000 atm; 15,000,000 psi), and densities of approximately 0.6 g/cm^{3}. The team did not expect to produce metallic hydrogen, as it was not using solid hydrogen, thought to be necessary, and was working at temperatures above those specified by metallization theory. Previous studies in which solid hydrogen was compressed inside diamond anvils to pressures of up to 250 GPa (2,500,000 atm; 37,000,000 psi), did not confirm detectable metallization. The team had sought simply to measure the less extreme electrical conductivity changes they expected. The researchers used a 1960s-era light-gas gun, originally employed in guided missile studies, to shoot an impactor plate into a sealed container containing a half-millimeter thick sample of liquid hydrogen. The liquid hydrogen was in contact with wires leading to a device measuring electrical resistance. The scientists found that, as pressure rose to 140 GPa (1,400,000 atm; 21,000,000 psi), the electronic energy band gap, a measure of electrical resistance, fell to almost zero. The band gap of hydrogen in its uncompressed state is about 15 eV, making it an insulator but, as the pressure increases significantly, the band gap gradually fell to 0.3 eV. Because the thermal energy of the fluid (the temperature became about 3,000 K or 2,730 °C due to compression of the sample) was above 0.3 eV, the hydrogen might be considered metallic.

=== Other experimental research, 1996–2004 ===
Many experiments are continuing in the production of metallic hydrogen in laboratory conditions at static compression and low temperature. Arthur Ruoff and Chandrabhas Narayana from Cornell University in 1998, and later Paul Loubeyre and René LeToullec from Commissariat à l'Énergie Atomique, France in 2002, have shown that at pressures close to those at the center of the Earth (320–340 GPa or 3,200,000–3,400,000 atm) and temperatures of 100–300 K (−173–27 °C), hydrogen is still not a true alkali metal, because of the non-zero band gap. The quest to see metallic hydrogen in laboratory at low temperature and static compression continues. Studies are also ongoing on deuterium. Shahriar Badiei and Leif Holmlid from the University of Gothenburg have shown in 2004 that condensed metallic states made of excited hydrogen atoms (Rydberg matter) are effective promoters to metallic hydrogen, however these results are disputed.

=== Pulsed laser heating experiment, 2008 ===
The theoretically predicted maximum of the melting curve (the prerequisite for the liquid metallic hydrogen) was discovered by Shanti Deemyad and Isaac F. Silvera by using pulsed laser heating. Hydrogen-rich molecular silane (SiH_{4}) was claimed to be metallized and become superconducting by M.I. Eremets et al.. This claim is disputed, and their results have not been repeated.

=== Observation of liquid metallic hydrogen, 2011 ===
In 2011 Eremets and Troyan reported observing the liquid metallic state of hydrogen and deuterium at static pressures of 260–300 GPa (2,600,000–3,000,000 atm). This claim was questioned by other researchers in 2012.

=== Z machine, 2015 ===
In 2015, scientists at the Z Pulsed Power Facility announced the creation of metallic deuterium using dense liquid deuterium, an electrical insulator-to-conductor transition associated with an increase in optical reflectivity.

=== Claimed observation of solid metallic hydrogen, 2016 ===
On 5 October 2016, Ranga Dias and Isaac F. Silvera of Harvard University released claims in a pre-print manuscript of experimental evidence that solid metallic hydrogen had been synthesized in the laboratory at a pressure of around 495 GPa (4,890,000 atm; 71,800,000 psi) using a diamond anvil cell. A revised version was published in Science in 2017.

In the preprint version of the paper, Dias and Silvera write:

With increasing pressure we observe changes in the sample, going from transparent, to black, to a reflective metal, the latter studied at a pressure of 495 GPa... the reflectance using a Drude free electron model to determine the plasma frequency of 30.1 eV at T = 5.5 K, with a corresponding electron carrier density of 6.7×10^{23} particles/cm^{3}, consistent with theoretical estimates. The properties are those of a metal. Solid metallic hydrogen has been produced in the laboratory.

— Dias & Silvera (2016)

In June 2019 a team at the Commissariat à l'énergie atomique et aux énergies alternatives (French Alternative Energies & Atomic Energy Commission) claimed to have created metallic hydrogen at around 425 GPa (4,190,000 atm).

W. Ferreira et al. (including Dias and Silvera) repeated their experiments multiple times after the Science article was published, finally publishing in 2023 and finding metallisation of hydrogen between 477 and 491 GPa (4,710,000 and 4,850,000 atm). This time, the pressure was released to assess the question of metastability. Metallic hydrogen was not found to be metastable to zero pressure.

=== Experiments on fluid deuterium at the National Ignition Facility, 2018 ===
In August 2018, scientists announced new observations regarding the rapid transformation of fluid deuterium from an insulating to a metallic form below 2000 K. Remarkable agreement is found between the experimental data and the predictions based on quantum Monte Carlo simulations, which is expected to be the most accurate method to date. This may help researchers better understand giant gas planets, such as Jupiter, Saturn and related exoplanets, since such planets are thought to contain a lot of liquid metallic hydrogen, which may be responsible for their observed powerful magnetic fields.

== See also ==
- Hydride#Interstitial hydrides or metallic hydrides
- Hydrogen safety#Cryogenics
- Juno (spacecraft)
- Metallization pressure
- Slush hydrogen
- Timeline of hydrogen technologies
