= Room-temperature superconductor =

Material which exhibits superconductivity above 0 °C

Unsolved problem in physics
Is it possible to make a material that is a superconductor at room temperature and atmospheric pressure?
More unsolved problems in physics

A room-temperature superconductor is a hypothetical material capable of displaying superconductivity above 0 °C (273 K; 32 °F), operating temperatures which are commonly encountered in everyday settings. As of 2023, the material with the highest accepted superconducting temperature was highly pressurized lanthanum decahydride, whose transition temperature is approximately 250 K (−23 °C; −10 °F) at 150 GPa.

At standard atmospheric pressure, the mercury-based compound HG-1223 currently holds the temperature record, manifesting superconductivity at temperatures as high as 151 K (−122 °C; −188 °F). Over time, researchers have consistently encountered superconductivity at temperatures previously considered unexpected or impossible. The concept of "near-room temperature" transient effects has been a subject of discussion since the early 1950s.

As of 2026, the possibility of room temperature superconductivity was under active investigation.

== Reports ==
Since the discovery of high-temperature superconductors ("high" being temperatures above 77 K (−196.2 °C; −321.1 °F), the boiling point of liquid nitrogen), several materials have been claimed, although not confirmed, to be room-temperature superconductors.

=== Corroborated studies ===
In 2014, an article published in Nature suggested that some materials, notably YBCO (yttrium barium copper oxide), could be made to briefly superconduct at room temperature using infrared laser pulses.

In 2015, an article published in Nature by researchers of the Otto Hahn Institute suggested that under certain conditions such as extreme pressure H_{2}S transitioned to a superconductive form H_{3}S at 150 GPa (around 1.5 million times atmospheric pressure) in a diamond anvil cell. The critical temperature is 203 K (−70 °C) which would be the highest T_{c} ever recorded and their research suggests that other hydrogen compounds could superconduct at up to 260 K (−13 °C).

Also in 2018, researchers noted a possible superconducting phase at 260 K (−13 °C) in lanthanum decahydride (LaH_{10}) at elevated (200 GPa) pressure. In 2019, the material with the highest accepted superconducting temperature was highly pressurized lanthanum decahydride, whose transition temperature is approximately 250 K (−23 °C) at 150 GPa.

Though not room temperature, a rare earth 'infinite layer' nickelate was recently discovered that superconducted at the unheard of (for nickelates) temperature of 44K at ambient pressure. This material is stable in air unlike cuprates, and other nickelates may have even higher critical temperatures. The current theory is that these materials leverage very unusual physics including pair density waves (PDW) that may not be as sensitive to the normal pitfalls of high temperature superconductors like low critical current.

=== Uncorroborated studies ===
In 1993 and 1997, Michel Laguës and his team published evidence of room temperature superconductivity observed on Molecular Beam Epitaxy (MBE) deposited ultrathin nanostructures of bismuth strontium calcium copper oxide (BSCCO, pronounced bisko, Bi_{2}Sr_{2}Ca_{n−1}Cu_{n}O_{2n+4+x}). These compounds exhibit extremely low resistivities orders of magnitude below that of copper, strongly non-linear I(V) characteristics and hysteretic I(V) behavior.

In 2000, while extracting electrons from diamond during ion implantation work, South African physicist Johan Prins claimed to have observed a phenomenon that he explained as room-temperature superconductivity within a phase formed on the surface of oxygen-doped type IIa diamonds in a 10^{−6} mbar vacuum.

In 2003, a group of researchers published results on high-temperature superconductivity in palladium hydride (PdH_{x}: x > 1) and an explanation in 2004. In 2007, the same group published results suggesting a superconducting transition temperature of 260 K, with transition temperature increasing as the density of hydrogen inside the palladium lattice increases. This has not been corroborated by other groups.

In March 2021, an announcement reported superconductivity in a layered yttrium-palladium-hydron material at 262 K and a pressure of 187 GPa. Palladium may act as a hydrogen migration catalyst in the material.

On 31 December 2023, "Global Room-Temperature Superconductivity in Graphite" was published in the journal Advanced Quantum Technologies, claiming to demonstrate superconductivity at room temperature and ambient pressure in highly oriented pyrolytic graphite with dense arrays of nearly parallel line defects.

=== Retracted or unreliable studies ===
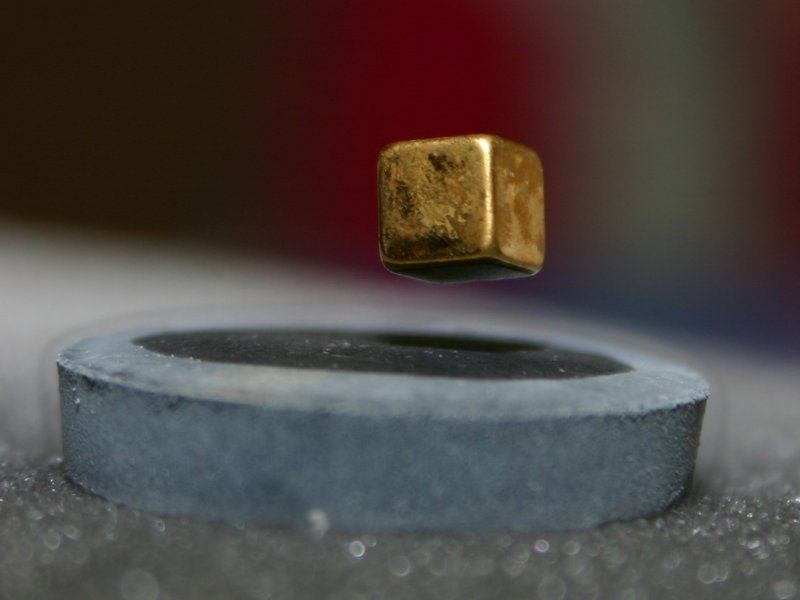
A magnet levitating above a superconductor (at −200 °C) that is exhibiting the Meissner effect.

In 2012, an Advanced Materials article claimed superconducting behavior of graphite powder after treatment with pure water at temperatures as high as 300 K and above. So far, the authors have not been able to demonstrate the occurrence of a clear Meissner phase and the vanishing of the material's resistance.

In 2018, Dev Kumar Thapa and Anshu Pandey from the Solid State and Structural Chemistry Unit of the Indian Institute of Science, Bangalore claimed the observation of superconductivity at ambient pressure and room temperature in films and pellets of a nanostructured material that is composed of silver particles embedded in a gold matrix. Due to similar noise patterns of supposedly independent plots and the publication's lack of peer review, the results have been called into question. Although the researchers repeated their findings in a later paper in 2019, this claim is yet to be verified and confirmed.

Since 2016, a team led by Ranga P. Dias has produced a number of retracted or challenged papers in this field. In 2016 they claimed observation of solid metallic hydrogen. In October 2020, they reported room-temperature superconductivity at 288 K (at 15 °C) in a carbonaceous sulfur hydride at 267 GPa, triggered into crystallisation via green laser. This was retracted in 2022 after flaws in their statistical methods were identified and led to questioning of other data. In 2023 he reported superconductivity at 294 K and 1 GPa in nitrogen-doped lutetium hydride, in a paper widely met with skepticism about its methods and data. Later in 2023 he was found to have plagiarized parts of his dissertation from someone else's thesis, and to have fabricated data in a paper on manganese disulfide, which was retracted. The lutetium hydride paper was also retracted. The first attempts to replicate those results failed.

On 23 July 2023, a Korean team claimed that Cu-doped lead apatite, which they named LK-99, was superconducting up to 400 K, though they had not observed this fully. They posted two preprints to arXiv, published a paper in a journal, and submitted a patent application. The reported observations were received with skepticism by experts due to the lack of clear signatures of superconductivity. The story was widely discussed on social media, leading to a large number of attempted replications, none of which had more than qualified success. By mid-August, a series of papers from major labs provided significant evidence that LK-99 was not a superconductor, finding resistivity much higher than copper, and explaining observed effects such as magnetic response and resistance drops in terms of impurities and ferromagnetism in the material.

== Theories ==
=== Metallic hydrogen and phonon-mediated pairing ===
Theoretical work by British physicist Neil Ashcroft predicted that solid metallic hydrogen at extremely high pressure (~500 GPa) should become superconducting at approximately room temperature, due to its extremely high speed of sound and expected strong coupling between the conduction electrons and the lattice-vibration phonons.

A team at Harvard University has claimed to make metallic hydrogen and reports a pressure of 495 GPa. Though the exact critical temperature has not yet been determined, weak signs of a possible Meissner effect and changes in magnetic susceptibility at 250 K may have appeared in early magnetometer tests on an original now-lost sample. A French team is working with doughnut shapes rather than planar at the diamond culette tips.

=== Organic polymers and exciton-mediated pairing ===
In 1964, William A. Little proposed the possibility of high-temperature superconductivity in organic polymers.

=== Other hydrides ===
In 2004, Ashcroft returned to his idea and suggested that hydrogen-rich compounds can become metallic and superconducting at lower pressures than hydrogen. More specifically, he proposed a novel way to pre-compress hydrogen chemically by examining IVa hydrides.

In 2014–2015, conventional superconductivity was observed in a sulfur hydride system (H_{2}S or H_{3}S) at 190 K to 203 K at pressures of up to 200 GPa.

In 2016, research suggested a link between palladium hydride containing small impurities of sulfur nanoparticles as a plausible explanation for the anomalous transient resistance drops seen during some experiments, and hydrogen absorption by cuprates was suggested in light of the 2015 results in H_{2}S as a plausible explanation for transient resistance drops or "USO" noticed in the 1990s by Chu et al. during research after the discovery of YBCO.

It has been predicted that ScH_{12} (scandium dodecahydride) would exhibit superconductivity at room temperature – T_{c} between 333 K (60 °C) and 398 K (125 °C) – under a pressure expected not to exceed 100 GPa.

Some research efforts are currently moving towards ternary superhydrides, where it has been predicted that Li_{2}MgH_{16} (dilithium magnesium hexadecahydride) would have a T_{c} of 473 K (200 °C) at 250 GPa.

=== Spin coupling ===
It is also possible that if the bipolaron explanation is correct, a normally semiconducting material can transition under some conditions into a superconductor if a critical level of alternating spin coupling in a single plane within the lattice is exceeded; this may have been documented in very early experiments from 1986. The best analogy here would be anisotropic magnetoresistance, but in this case the outcome is a drop to zero rather than a decrease within a very narrow temperature range for the compounds tested similar to "re-entrant superconductivity".

In 2018, support was found for electrons having anomalous 3/2 spin states in YPtBi. Though YPtBi is a relatively low temperature superconductor, this does suggest another approach to creating superconductors.

"Quantum bipolarons" could describe how a material might superconduct at up to nearly room temperature.

== See also ==
- Superconducting material
- BCS theory
