= Apatite =

Mineral group, calcium phosphate

Apatite group
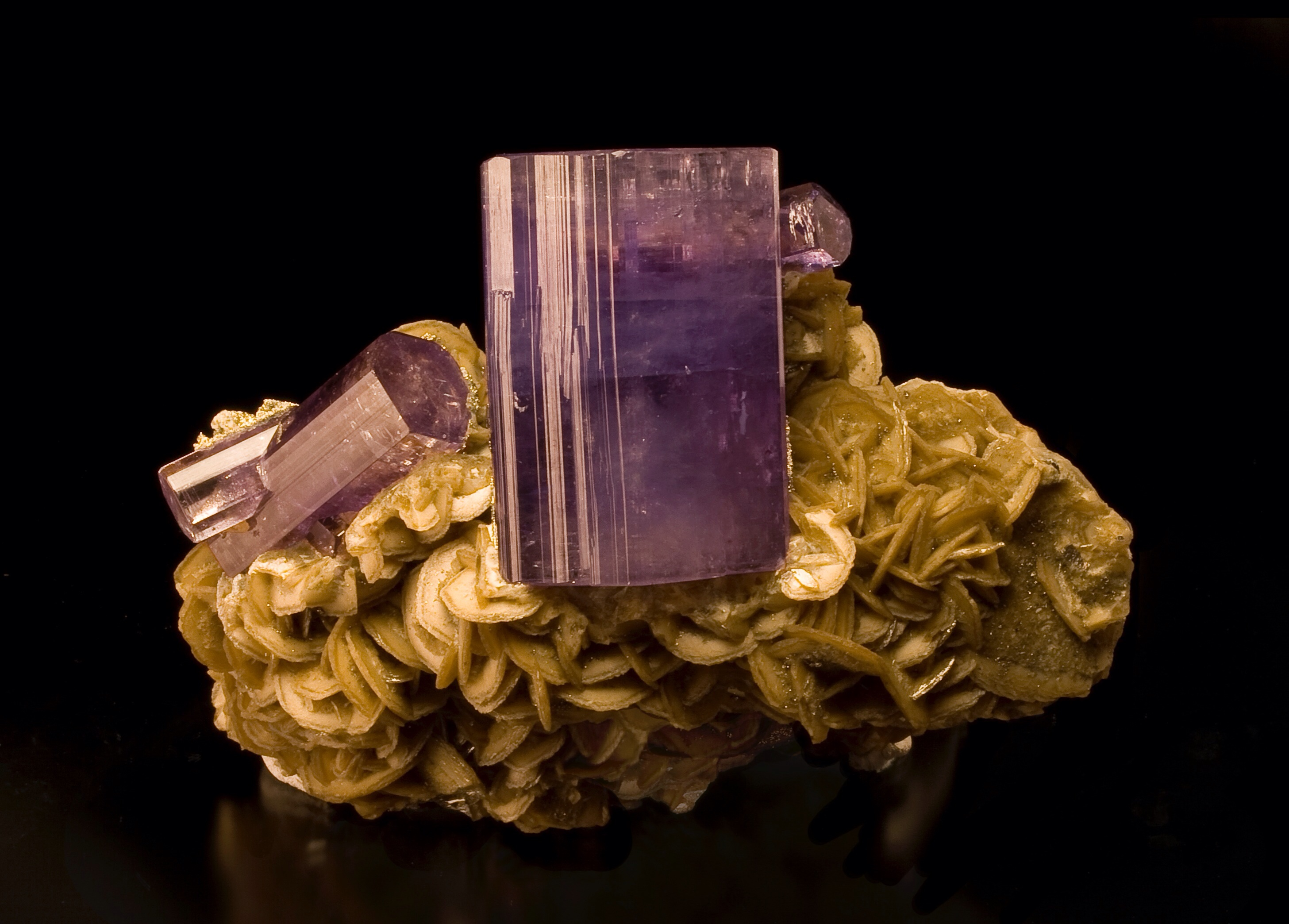
- Apatite (purple), on siderite, from Portugal

General
- Category: Phosphate mineral
- Formula: Ca_{5}(PO_{4})_{3}(F,Cl,OH)
- IMA symbol: Ap
- Strunz classification: 8.BN.05
- Crystal system: Hexagonal
- Crystal class: Dipyramidal (6/m) (same H-M symbol)
- Space group: P6_{3}/m (no. 176)

Identification
- Color: Transparent to translucent, usually green, less often colorless, yellow, blue to violet, pink, brown.
- Crystal habit: Tabular, prismatic crystals, massive, compact or granular
- Cleavage: [0001] indistinct, [1010] indistinct
- Fracture: Conchoidal to uneven
- Mohs scale hardness: 5 (defining mineral)
- Luster: Vitreous to subresinous
- Streak: White
- Diaphaneity: Transparent to translucent
- Specific gravity: 3.16–3.22
- Polish luster: Vitreous
- Optical properties: Double refractive, uniaxial negative
- Refractive index: 1.634–1.638 (+0.012, −0.006)
- Birefringence: 0.002–0.008
- Pleochroism: Blue stones – strong, blue and yellow to colorless. Other colors are weak to very weak.
- Dispersion: 0.013
- Ultraviolet fluorescence: Yellow stones – purplish-pink, which is stronger in long wave; blue stones – blue to light-blue in both long and short wave; green stones – greenish-yellow, which is stronger in long wave; violet stones – greenish-yellow in long wave, light-purple in short wave.

Apatite is a group of phosphate minerals, usually hydroxyapatite, fluorapatite and chlorapatite, with high concentrations of OH^{−}, F^{−} and Cl^{−} ion, respectively, in the crystal. The formula of the admixture of the three most common endmembers is written as Ca_{10}(PO_{4})_{6}(OH,F,Cl)_{2}, and the crystal unit cell formulae of the individual minerals are written as Ca_{10}(PO_{4})_{6}(OH)_{2}, Ca_{10}(PO_{4})_{6}F_{2} and Ca_{10}(PO_{4})_{6}Cl_{2}.

The mineral was named apatite by the German geologist Abraham Gottlob Werner in 1786, although the specific mineral he had described was reclassified as fluorapatite in 1860 by the German mineralogist Karl Friedrich August Rammelsberg. Apatite is often mistaken for other minerals. This tendency is reflected in the mineral's name, which is derived from the Greek word ἀπατάω (apatáō), which means 'to deceive'.

As hydroxyapatite, it forms a major part of the teeth and bones of vertebrate animals.

== Geology ==
Apatite is very common as an accessory mineral in igneous and metamorphic rocks, where it is the most common phosphate mineral. However, occurrences are usually as small grains which are often visible only in thin section. Coarsely crystalline apatite is usually restricted to pegmatites, gneiss derived from sediments rich in carbonate minerals, skarns, or marble. Apatite is also found in clastic sedimentary rock as grains eroded from the source rock. Its presence in certain rocks may also be due to animal skeleton breakdown or precipitation onto surfaces, especially fish scales or bone pieces, from sea water. Phosphorite is a phosphate-rich sedimentary rock containing as much as 80% apatite, which is present as cryptocrystalline masses referred to as collophane. Economic quantities of apatite are also sometimes found in nepheline syenite or in carbonatites.

Apatite is the defining mineral for 5 on the Mohs scale. It can be distinguished in the field from beryl and tourmaline by its relative softness. It is often fluorescent under ultraviolet light.

Apatite is one of a few minerals produced and used by biological micro-environmental systems. Hydroxyapatite (IMA name: Hydroxylapatite), is the major component of tooth enamel and bone mineral. A relatively rare form of apatite in which most of the OH groups are absent and containing many carbonate and acid phosphate substitutions is a large component of bone material.

Fluorapatite (or fluoroapatite) is more resistant to acid attack than is hydroxyapatite; in the mid-20th century, it was discovered that communities whose water supply naturally contained fluorine had lower rates of dental caries. Fluoridated water allows exchange in the teeth of fluoride ions for hydroxyl groups in apatite. Similarly, toothpaste typically contains a source of fluoride anions (e.g. sodium fluoride, sodium monofluorophosphate). Too much fluoride results in dental fluorosis and skeletal fluorosis.

Fission tracks in apatite are commonly used to determine the thermal histories of orogenic belts and of sediments in sedimentary basins. (U-Th)/He dating of apatite is also well established from noble gas diffusion studies for use in determining thermal histories and other, less typical applications such as paleo-wildfire dating.

== Uses ==
The primary use of apatite is as a source of phosphate in the manufacture of fertilizer and in other industrial uses. It is occasionally used as a gemstone. Ground apatite was used as a pigment for the Terracotta Army of third-century BCE China, and in Qing dynasty enamel for metalware.

During digestion of apatite with sulfuric acid to make phosphoric acid, hydrogen fluoride is produced as a byproduct from any fluorapatite content. This byproduct is a minor industrial source of hydrofluoric acid. Apatite is also occasionally a source of uranium and vanadium, present as trace elements in the mineral.

Fluoro-chloro apatite forms the basis of the now obsolete halophosphor fluorescent tube phosphor system. Dopant elements of manganese and antimony, at less than one mole-percent — in place of the calcium and phosphorus — impart the fluorescence, and adjustment of the fluorine-to-chlorine ratio alter the shade of white produced. This system has been almost entirely replaced by the tri-phosphor system.

Apatites are also a proposed host material for storage of nuclear waste, along with other phosphates.

=== Gemology ===
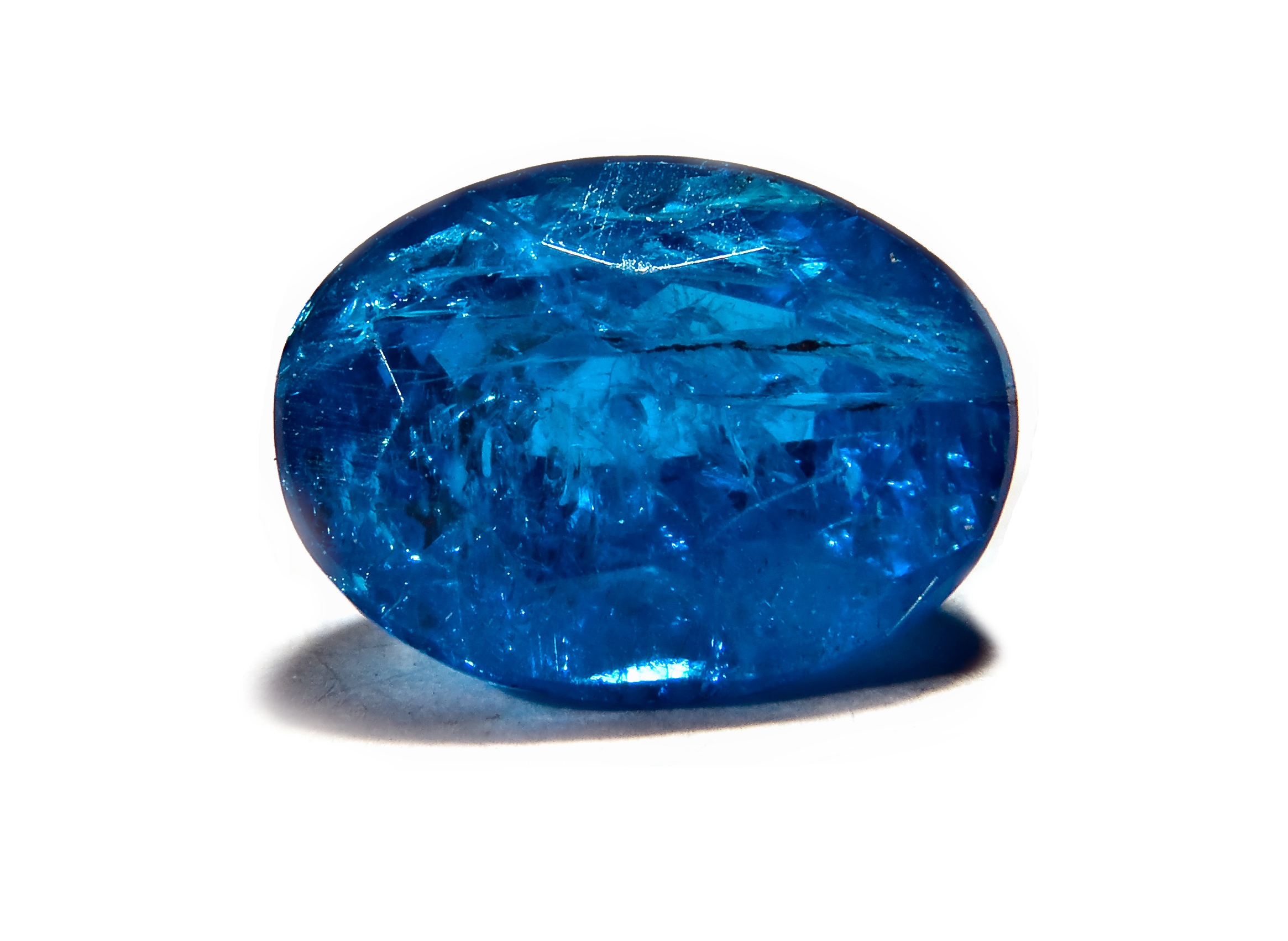
Faceted blue apatite, Brazil

Apatite is infrequently used as a gemstone. Transparent stones of clean color have been faceted, and chatoyant specimens have been cabochon-cut. Chatoyant stones are known as cat's-eye apatite, transparent green stones are known as asparagus stone, and blue stones have been called moroxite. If crystals of rutile have grown in the crystal of apatite, in the right light the cut stone displays a cat's-eye effect. Major sources for gem apatite are Brazil, Myanmar, and Mexico. Other sources include Canada, Czech Republic, Germany, India, Madagascar, Mozambique, Norway, South Africa, Spain, Sri Lanka, and the United States.

=== Use as an ore mineral ===
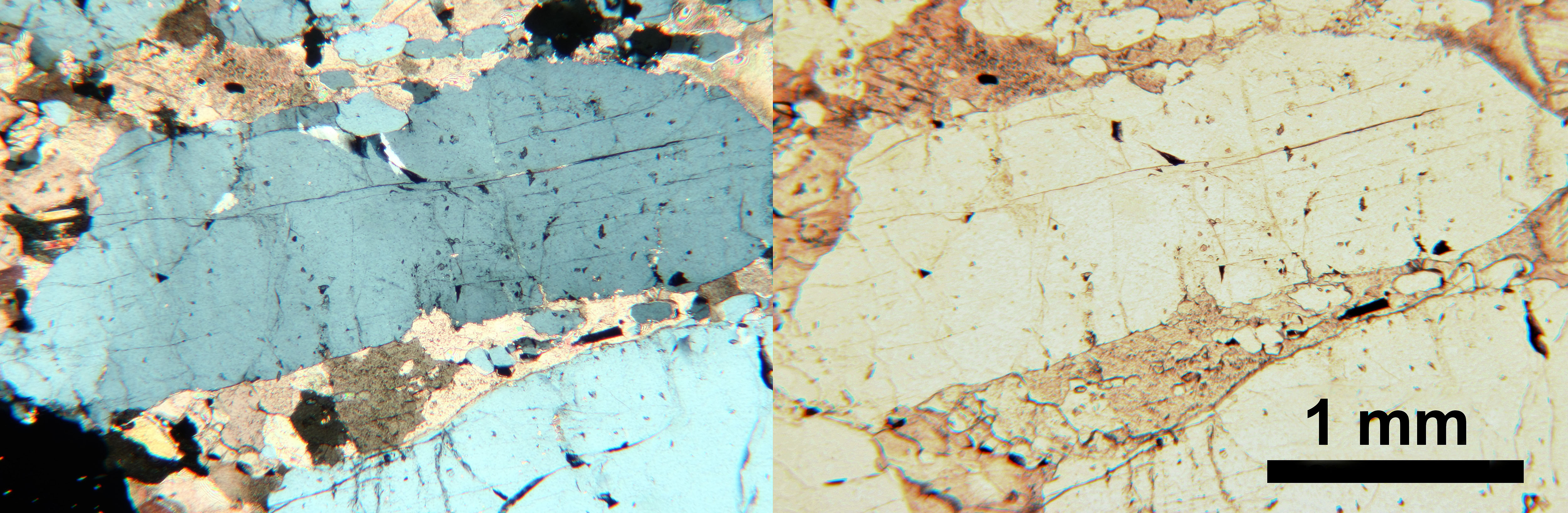
Apatite in photomicrographs of a thin section from the Siilinjärvi apatite mine. In cross-polarized light on left, plane-polarized light on right.

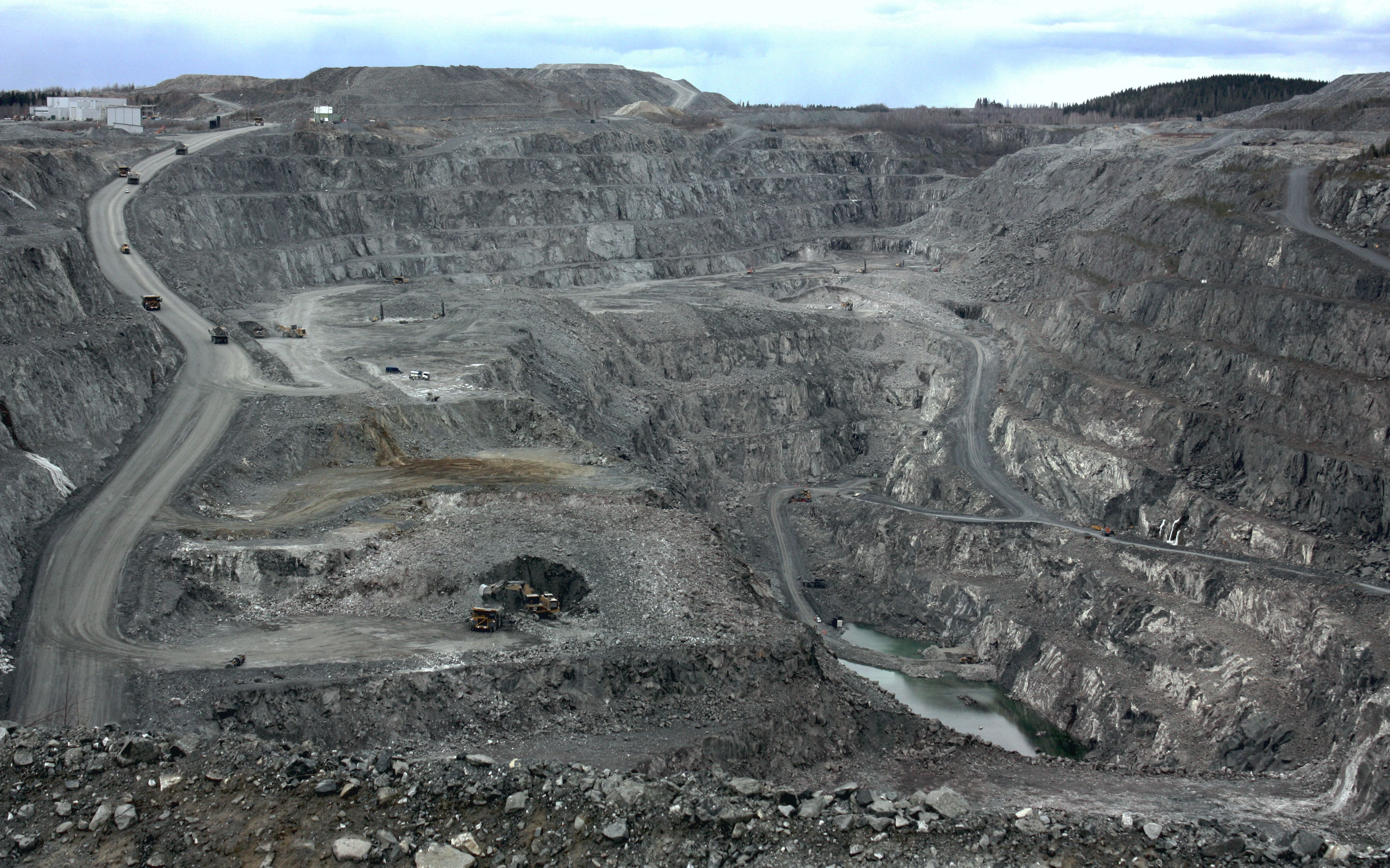
An apatite mine in Siilinjärvi, Finland

Apatite is occasionally found to contain significant amounts of rare-earth elements and can be used as an ore for those metals. This is preferable to traditional rare-earth ores such as monazite, as apatite is not very radioactive and does not pose an environmental hazard in mine tailings. However, apatite often contains uranium and its equally radioactive decay-chain nuclides.

The town of Apatity in the Arctic North of Russia was named for its mining operations for these ores.

Apatite is an ore mineral at the Hoidas Lake rare-earth project.

== Thermodynamics ==
The standard enthalpies of formation in the crystalline state of hydroxyapatite, chlorapatite and a preliminary value for bromapatite, have been determined by reaction-solution calorimetry. Speculations on the existence of a possible fifth member of the calcium apatites family, iodoapatite, have been drawn from energetic considerations.

Structural and thermodynamic properties of crystal hexagonal calcium apatites, Ca_{10}(PO_{4})_{6}X_{2} (X= OH, F, Cl, Br), have been investigated using an all-atom Born-Huggins-Mayer potential by a molecular dynamics technique. The accuracy of the model by Cruz et al. (2005) at room temperature and atmospheric pressure was checked against crystal structural data, with maximum deviations of c. 4% for the haloapatites and 8% for hydroxyapatite. High-pressure simulation runs, in the range 0.5–75 kbar, were performed in order to estimate the isothermal compressibility coefficient of those compounds. The deformation of the compressed solids is always elastically anisotropic, with BrAp exhibiting a markedly different behavior from those displayed by HOAp and ClAp. High-pressure p-V data were fitted to the Parsafar-Mason equation of state with an accuracy better than 1%.

The monoclinic solid phases Ca_{10}(PO_{4})_{6}X_{2} (X= OH, Cl) and the molten hydroxyapatite compound have also been studied by molecular dynamics.

== Lunar science ==
Moon rocks collected by astronauts during the Apollo program contain traces of apatite. Following new insights about the presence of water in the Moon, re-analysis of these samples in 2010 revealed water trapped in the mineral as hydroxyl, leading to estimates of water on the lunar surface at a rate of at least 64 parts per billion – 100 times greater than previous estimates – and as high as 5 parts per million. If the minimum amount of mineral-locked water was hypothetically converted to liquid, it would cover the Moon's surface in roughly one meter of water.

== Bio-leaching ==
The ectomycorrhizal fungi Suillus granulatus and Paxillus involutus can release elements from apatite. Release of phosphate from apatite is one of the most important activities of mycorrhizal fungi, which increase phosphorus uptake in plants.

== Apatite group and supergroup ==
Apatite is the prototype of a class of chemically, stoichometrically or structurally similar minerals, biological materials, and synthetic chemicals. Those most similar to apatite are also known as apatites, such as lead apatite (pyromorphite) and barium apatite (alforsite). More chemically dissimilar minerals of the apatite supergroup include belovites, britholites, ellestadites and hedyphanes.

Apatites have been investigated for their potential use as pigments (copper-doped alkaline earth apatites), as phosphors and for absorbing and immobilising toxic heavy metals.

In apatite minerals strontium, barium and lead can be substituted for calcium; arsenate and vanadate for phosphate; and the final balancing anion can be fluoride (fluorapatites), chloride (chlorapatites), hydroxide (hydroxyapatites) or oxide (oxyapatites). Synthetic apatites add hypomanganate, hypochromate, bromide (bromoapatites), iodide (iodoapatites), sulfide (sulfoapatites), and selenide (selenoapatites). Evidence for natural sulfide substitution has been found in lunar rock samples.

Furthermore, compensating substitution of monovalent and trivalent cations for calcium, of dibasic and tetrabasic anions for phosphate, and of the balancing anion, can occur to a greater or lesser degree. For example, in biological apatites there is appreciable substitution of sodium for calcium and carbonate for phosphate, in belovite sodium and cerium or lanthanum substitute for a pair of divalent metal ions, in germanate-pyromorphite germanate replaces phosphate and chloride, and in ellestadites silicate and sulphate replace pairs of phosphate anions. Metals forming smaller divalent ions, such as magnesium and iron, cannot substitute extensively for the relatively large calcium ions but may be present in small quantities.

== See also ==
- List of minerals
- Thermal history modelling
- Hexafluorosilicic acid
- Hydroxyapatite in bone
