= Helium dating =

Radiometric dating method

Helium dating (abbreviated (U–Th)/He dating) refers to a variety of He diffusion methods that utilize the mobility of radiogenic He atoms to determine the thermal history of a rock. Helium diffusion experiments are often used to help interpret information retrieved from U–Th/He thermochronometric experiments. Kinematic parameters derived from He diffusion is done through estimating He diffusion over a range of temperatures. The use of density functional theory helps in estimating energy barriers for He to overcome as it diffuses across various crystallographic directions. Discrepancies, however, between observed and predicted He diffusion rates is still a problem and likely stem from unresolved problems in crystal defects and radiation damage in natural grains as opposed to theoretical grains. Depending on the mineral analyzed there are different assumptions to be made on He mobility. For example, He diffusion in minerals such as zircon, rutile, and monazite have been shown to be strongly anisotropic.

A relatively new dating method, tritium–helium dating has been developed for determining rates of oxygen utilization in the ocean.

== ^{4}He/^{3}He Thermochronometry ==
Traditional U–Th/He thermochronometry determines the temperature T_{c} that the analyzed sample had at a time in the past corresponding to the age given by its content of parent and daughter nuclides. More information, however, can be concluded about a mineral's thermal history if an analysis of the He distribution in-situ is performed. Similar to the argon–argon dating (which uses ^{40}Ar and ^{39}Ar isotopes) where ^{39}Ar is a second non-radiogenically produced isotope derived from ^{39}K, each step-heating release of ^{39}Ar can be directly associated with a date. With Helium-3 (^{3}He) production the ^{4}He/^{3}He evolution is interpreted to provide an intragranular Helium-4 (^{4}He) distribution. This method is superior in two ways: diffusion kinetics for ^{4}He can be precisely determined and the ^{4}He distribution provides a continuous path in a time-temperature history s opposed to a single point in a bulk-grain date.

More specifically, the ^{4}He distribution in a grain is a function of the time-integrated internal production from parent nuclides, minus diffusion loss and alpha ejection. This is done in conjunction with the assumption that the model is a spherical grain and calculations correlate with a radial position within that sphere. These calculations also assume that diffusion is isotropic.

== Use to support creationism ==
In 1997, the Institute of Creation Research began a research project, named "RATE" (Radioisotopes and the Age of The Earth), which aimed at determining the validity of scientifically accepted radiometric dating. One paper published from this research project describes the perceived issues of uniformitarian (U–Th)/He dating. The assumptions made in the creationist arguments neglect the sensitivity that He diffusion methods have in regard to temperature fluctuations over time – especially since the granodiorite analyzed in the study has very complex geologic and thermal history.
