= Hillard Bell Huntington =

American physicist (1910–1992)

Hillard Bell Huntington (21 December 1910 in Wilkes-Barre, Pennsylvania – 17 July 1992 Troy, New York) was a physicist who (together with Eugene Wigner) first proposed, in 1935, that hydrogen could occur in a metallic state. He is also known for his work on the electromigration of atoms, which later became an important consideration in semiconductor electronics.

Huntington was born in Wilkes-Barre, Pennsylvania, and received his bachelor's (1932), master's (1933) and doctoral (1941) degrees from Princeton University. He taught at Culver Military Academy, University of Pennsylvania and Washington University in St. Louis. During World War II Huntington worked at the MIT Radiation Laboratory.

Huntington joined the faculty of Rensselaer Polytechnic Institute in 1946. He served as chair of the physics department at RPI from 1961-1968. He was known as a specialist in diffusion and conduction processes in metals. He was an accomplished painter. Some of his paintings are displayed in the Hillard B. Huntington library, named in his honor, located in the Jonsson-Rowland Science center at RPI. RPI established the Hillard B. Huntington Award for graduate students in his honor.

Ivar Giaever, who won the Nobel Prize in Physics in 1973, was one of his students.
