= Metallization pressure =

Amount of pressure required for a non-metallic chemical element to become a metal

Metallization pressure is the pressure required for a non-metallic chemical element to become a metal. Every material is predicted to turn into a metal if the pressure is high enough, and temperature low enough. Some of these pressures are beyond the reach of diamond anvil cells, and are thus theoretical predictions. Neon has the highest metallization pressure for any element.

The value for phosphorus refers to pressurizing black phosphorus. The value for arsenic refers to pressurizing metastable black arsenic; grey arsenic, the standard state, is already a metallic conductor at standard conditions. Astatine is calculated to already be a metal at standard conditions, although its extreme radioactivity means that this has never been tested experimentally.

| Z | Element | p, Mbar | ref. | type |
|---|---|---|---|---|
| 1 | Hydrogen | 3.9 | | theoretical |
| 2 | Helium | 329 | | theoretical |
| 5 | Boron | 1.6 | | experimental |
| 6 | Carbon | 11 | | theoretical |
| 7 | Nitrogen | >> 5 | | theoretical |
| 8 | Oxygen | 0.96 | | experimental |
| 9 | Fluorine | 25 | | theoretical |
| 10 | Neon | 2084 | | theoretical |
| 14 | Silicon | 0.12 | | experimental |
| 15 | Phosphorus | 0.048 | | experimental |
| 16 | Sulfur | 0.83 | | experimental |
| 17 | Chlorine | 2.0 | | experimental |
| 18 | Argon | 5.1 | | theoretical |
| 32 | Germanium | 0.11 | | experimental |
| 33 | Arsenic | 0.022 | | theoretical |
| 34 | Selenium | 0.23 | | experimental |
| 35 | Bromine | 0.25 | | experimental |
| 36 | Krypton | 3.1 | | theoretical |
| 52 | Tellurium | 0.04 | | experimental |
| 53 | Iodine | 0.16 | | experimental |
| 54 | Xenon | 1.3 | | experimental |
| 86 | Radon | ≈ 0.15 | | theoretical |

== See also ==
- Metal–insulator transition
- Metallic hydrogen
- Nonmetallic material
