= Polyhydride =

Chemical compound

A polyhydride or superhydride is a compound that contains an abnormally large amount of hydrogen. This can be described as high hydrogen stoichiometry. Examples include iron pentahydride FeH_{5}, LiH_{6}, and LiH_{7}. By contrast, the more well known lithium hydride only has one hydrogen atom.

Polyhydrides are only known to be stable under high pressure.

Polyhydrides are important because they can form substances with a very high density of hydrogen. They may resemble the elusive metallic hydrogen, but can be made under lower pressures. One possibility is that they could be superconductors. Hydrogen sulfide under high pressures forms SH_{3} units, and can be a superconductor at 203 K (−70 °C) and a pressure of 1.5 million atmospheres (152 GPa).

== Structures ==
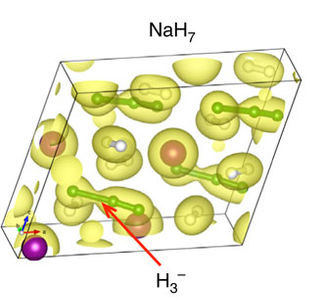
Unit cell diagram showing the structure of NaH_{7}, which contains H^{−}_{3} complexes. The coloured balls in the isosurface, plotted at the level of 0.07 electrons*Å^{−3}. One of H_{2} molecules is bonded to a hydrogen atom in the NaH unit with a bond length of 1.25 Å, forming a H^{−}_{3} linear anion.

The polyhydrides of alkaline earth and alkali metals contain cage structures. Also hydrogen may be clustered into H^{−}, H^{−}_{3}, or H_{2} units. Polyhydrides of transition metals may have the hydrogen atoms arranged around the metal atom. Computations suggest that increasing hydrogen levels will reduce the dimensionality of the metal arrangement, so that layers form separated by hydrogen sheets. The H^{−}_{3} substructure is linear.

H^{+}_{3} would form triangular structures in the hypothetical H_{5}Cl.

== Compounds ==
When sodium hydride is compressed with hydrogen, NaH_{3} and NaH_{7} form. These are formed at 30 GPa and 2,100 K.

Heating and compressing a metal with ammonia borane avoids using bulky hydrogen, and produces boron nitride as a decomposition product in addition to the polyhydride.

formula	name	temperature °C	pressure GPa	crystal structure	space group	a Å	b	c	β	cell volume	formulae per unit cell	Tc K	Comment	refs
LiH_{2}	lithium dihydride	27	130											
LiH_{6}	Lithium hexahydride													
LiH_{7}	Lithium heptahydride													
NaH_{3}	sodium trihydride			orthorhombic	Cmcm	3.332 Å	6.354 Å	4.142 Å	90	87.69	4			
NaH_{7}	sodium heptahydride			monoclinic	Cc	6.99	3.597	5.541	69.465	130.5				
CaH_{x}		500	22	double hexagon										
CaH_{x}		600	121											
Na_{3}FeH_{7}				tetragonal	P4_{2}/mnm								pentagonal bipyramidal FeH_{7}^{3–}	
Na_{3}CoH_{6}				orthorhombic	Pnma								ctahedral CoH_{6}^{3–}	
RbH_{9−x}			10		Cccm									
RbH_{9−x}					Cm									
SrH_{6}	strontium hexahydride			pseudo cubic	Pm3̅m								semiconductor metallize > 220 GPa	
Sr_{3}H_{13}	tristrontium tridecahydride				C2/m									
SrH_{22}	strontium docosahydride		138	triclinic	P1									
BaH_{12}	Barium dodecahydride		75	pseudo cubic		5.43	5.41	5.37		39.48		20K		
FeH_{5}	iron pentahydride	1200	66	tetragonal	I4/mmm									
H_{3}S	Sulfur trihydride	25	150	cubic	Im3̅m							203K		
H_{3}Se	Selenium trihydride		10											
YH_{4}	yttrium tetrahydride	700	160		I4/mmm									
YH_{6}	yttrium hexahydride	700	160		Im-3m							224		
YH_{9}	yttrium nonahydride	400	237		P6_{3}/mmc							243		
CsH_{7}	caesium heptahydride			tetragonal	P4/nmm									
CsH_{15+x}				triclinic	P1									
LaH_{10}	Lanthanum decahydride	1000	170	cubic	Fm3̅m	5.09	5.09	5.09		132	4	250K		
LaH_{10}	Lanthanum decahydride	25	121	Hexagonal	R3̅m	3.67	3.67	8.83			1			
LaD_{11}	Lanthanum undecahydride	2150	130-160	Tetragonal	P4/nmm							168		
LaH_{12}	Lanthanum dodecahydride			Cubic								insulating		
LaH_{7}	Lanthanum heptahydride	25	109	monoclinic	C2/m	6.44	3.8	3.69	135	63.9	2			
CeH_{9}	Cerium nonahydride		93	hexagonal	P6_{3}/mmc	3.711		5.543		33.053		100K		
CeH_{10}	Cerium decahydride				Fm3̅m							115K		
PrH_{9}	Praseodymium nonahydride		90-140		P6_{3}/mmc	3.60		5.47		61.5		55K 9K		
PrH_{9}	Praseodymium nonahydride		120		F43m	4.98				124		69K		
NdH_{4}	Neodymium tetrahydride		85-135	tetragonal	I4/mmm	2.8234		5,7808						
NdH_{7}	Neodymium heptahydride		85-135	monoclinic	C2/c	3.3177	6.252	5.707	89.354					
NdH_{9}	Neodymium nonahydride		110-130	hexagonal	P6_{3}/mmc	3.458		5.935						
EuH_{4}	europium tetrahydride		50-130		I4/mmm									
Eu_{8}H_{46}	octaeuropium hexatetracontahydride	1600	130	cubic	Pm3̅n	5.865								
EuH_{9}	Europium nonahydride		86-130	cubic	F4̅3m									
EuH_{9}	Europium nonahydride		>130	hexagonal	P6_{3}/mmc									
ThH_{4}	Thorium tetrahydride		86		I4/mmm	2.903		4.421		57.23	2			
ThH_{4}	Thorium tetrahydride		88	trigonal	P321	5.500		3.29		86.18				
ThH_{4}	Thorium tetrahydride			orthorhombic	Fmmm									
ThH_{6}	Thorium hexahydride		86-104		Cmc2_{1}					32.36				
ThH_{9}	Thorium nonahydride	2100	152	hexagonal	P6_{3}/mmc	3.713		5.541		66.20				
ThH_{10}	Thorium decahydride	1800	85-185	cubic	Fm3̅m	5.29				148.0		161		
ThH_{10}	Thorium decahydride		<85		Immm	5.304	3.287	3.647		74.03				
UH_{7}	Uranium heptahydride	2000	63	fcc	P6_{3}/mmc									
UH_{8}	Uranium octahydride	300	1-55	fcc	Fm3̅m									
UH_{9}	Uranium nonahydride		40-55	fcc	P6_{3}/mmc									

=== Predicted ===
Using computational chemistry many other polyhydrides are predicted, including LiH_{8}, LiH_{9}, LiH_{10}, CsH_{3}, KH_{5}, RbH_{5}, RbH_{9}, NaH_{9}, BaH_{6}, CaH_{6}, MgH_{4}, MgH_{12}, MgH_{16}, SrH_{4}, SrH_{10}, SrH_{12}, ScH_{4}, ScH_{6}, ScH_{8}, YH_{4} and YH_{6}, YH_{24}, LaH_{8}, LaH_{10}, YH_{9}, LaH_{11}, CeH_{8}, CeH_{9}, CeH_{10}, PrH_{8}, PrH_{9}, ThH_{6}, ThH_{7} and ThH_{10}, U_{2}H_{13}, UH_{7}, UH_{8}, UH_{9}, AlH_{5}, GaH_{5}, InH_{5}, SnH_{8}, SnH_{12}, SnH_{14}, PbH_{8}, SiH_{8} (subsequently discovered), GeH_{8}, (although Ge_{3}H_{11} may be stable instead) AsH_{8}, SbH_{4}, BiH_{4}, BiH_{5}, BiH_{6}, H_{3}Se, H_{3}S, Te_{2}H_{5}, TeH_{4}, PoH_{4}, PoH_{6}, H_{2}F, H_{3}F, H_{2}Cl, H_{3}Cl, H_{5}Cl, H_{7}Cl, H_{2}Br, H_{3}Br, H_{4}Br, H_{5}Br, H_{5}I, XeH_{2}, XeH_{4}.

Among the transition elements, VH_{8} in a C2/m structure around 200 GPa is predicted to have a superconducting transition temperature of 71.4 K. VH_{5} in a P6_{3}/mmm space group has a lower transition temperature.

== Properties ==
=== Superconduction ===
Under suitably high pressures polyhydrides may become superconducting. Characteristics of substances that are predicted to have high superconducting temperatures are a high phonon frequency, which will happen for light elements, and strong bonds. Hydrogen is the lightest and so will have the highest frequency of vibration. Even changing the isotope to deuterium will lower the frequency and lower the transition temperature. Compounds with more hydrogen will resemble the predicted metallic hydrogen. However, superconductors also tend to be substances with high symmetry and also need the electrons not to be locked into molecular subunits, and require large numbers of electrons in states near the Fermi level. There should also be electron-phonon coupling which happens when the electric properties are tied to the mechanical position of the hydrogen atoms. The highest superconduction critical temperatures are predicted to be in elements close to the junction of the different blocks (s-p; s-d; p-d; d-f) ie groups 2 and 3 of the periodic table. Late transitions elements, heavy lanthanides or actinides have extra d- or f-electrons that interfere with superconductivity.

For example, lithium hexahydride is predicted to lose all electrical resistance below 38 K at a pressure of 150 GPa. The hypothetical LiH_{8} has a predicted superconducting transition temperature at 31 K at 200 GPa. MgH_{6} is predicted to have a T_{c} of 400 K around 300 GPa. CaH_{6} could have a T_{c} of 260 K at 120 GPa. PH_{3} doped H_{3}S is also predicted to have a transition temperature above the 203 K measured for H_{3}S (contaminated with solid sulfur). Rare earth and actinide polyhydrides may also have highish transition temperatures, for example, ThH_{10} with T_{c} = 241 K. UH_{8}, which can be decompressed to room temperature without decomposition, is predicted to have a transition temperature of 193 K. AcH_{10}, if it could be ever made, is predicted to superconduct at temperatures over 204 K, and AcH_{10} would be similarly conducting under lower pressures (150 GPa).

H_{3}Se actually is a van der Waals solid with formula 2H_{2}Se·H_{2} with a measured T_{c} of 105 K under a pressure of 135 GPa.

=== Ternary superhydrides ===
Ternary superhydrides open up the possibility of many more formulas. For example, Li_{2}MgH_{16} may also be superconducting at high temperatures (200 °C). A compound of lanthanum, boron and hydrogen is speculated to be a "hot" superconductor (550 K). Elements may substitute for others and so modify the properties eg (La,Y)H_{6} and (La,Y)H_{10} can be made to have a slightly higher critical temperature than YH_{6} or LaH_{10}.

== See also ==
- Potassium nonahydridorhenate, stable at ordinary pressures
