= Jorge E. Hirsch =

Argentine American physics academic

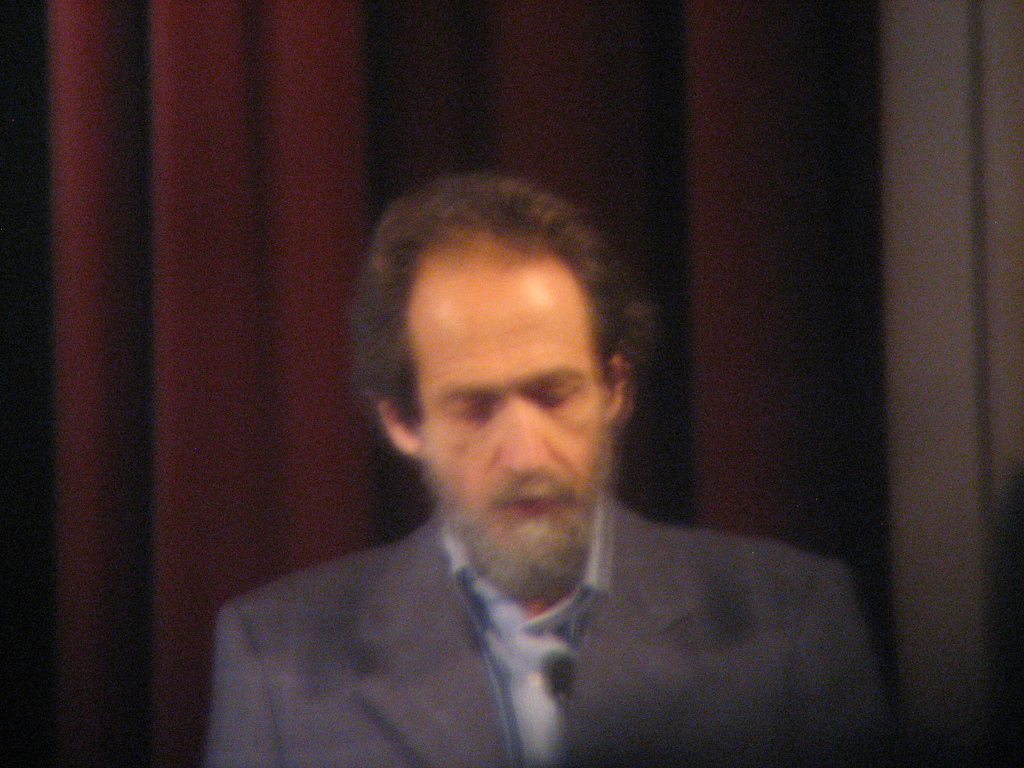
- Professor Jorge E. Hirsch giving a talk
- Born: 1953 (age 72–73); Buenos Aires, Argentina
- Education: University of Buenos Aires (UG); University of Chicago (PhD)
- Known for: Inventor of h-index
- Scientific career
- Fields: Physics
- Workplaces: Kavli Institute for Theoretical Physics; University of California, Santa Barbara; University of California, San Diego
- Thesis: Low-temperature thermodynamic properties of a random anisotropic antiferromagnetic chain (1980)
- Website: jorge.physics.ucsd.edu

Jorge Eduardo Hirsch (born 1953) is an Argentine American professor of physics at the University of California, San Diego. Hirsch received a PhD in physics from the University of Chicago in 1980 and completed his postdoctoral research at the Kavli Institute for Theoretical Physics at the University of California, Santa Barbara in 1983. He is known for inventing the h-index in 2005, an index for quantifying a scientist's publication productivity and the basis of several scholar indices.

== Background ==
Hirsch was born in Buenos Aires, Argentina. He earned an undergraduate degree at the University of Buenos Aires, and a CONICET research fellowship in 1975. A Fulbright Scholarship awarded to him in 1976 took him to the University of Chicago, where he received a Telegdi Prize for the best Candidacy Examination in 1977 and was awarded the Victor J. Andrew Memorial Fellowship in 1978. He received his PhD from the University of Chicago in 1980 and served as a post-doctoral research associate in the Kavli Institute for Theoretical Physics at the University of California, Santa Barbara. Following this experience, he joined the University of California, San Diego Department of Physics in 1983.

== Research ==
=== Physics ===
Hirsch's scientific work is involved with understanding collective, large-scale properties of solids, such as superconductivity and ferromagnetism, based on explanations starting from small-scale mechanisms. Hirsch's most significant work would be his attempt to unify theories of superconductivity with his theory of hole superconductivity which suggests pairing of electron holes that would lead to high temperature superconductivity as opposed to pairing of electrons in conventional BCS theory. He believes that there is a single mechanism of superconductivity for all materials that explains the Meissner effect and differs from the conventional mechanism in several fundamental aspects.

Hirsch was involved in a heated debate about a 2020 report of high temperature superconductivity. In February 2022 he was banned from posting papers for 6 months at the ArXiv for submitting manuscripts that had "inflammatory content and unprofessional language". On March 21, 2023 Hirsch presented at the American Physical Society virtual March meeting regarding the society's position on analysis of published data with regard to the controversial room temperature superconductivity debate. Hirsch also provided an overview of his perspective on the controversy with fellow UCSD colleague Brian Keating on the podcast Into the Impossible.

Recently, he has come out in strong support of the idea that photons emerge naturally from Maxwell's fields while assuming magnetic flux quantisation.

=== Bibliometrics ===
The h-index proposed by Hirsch in 2005 became a widely known alternative bibliometric parameter that combines both numbers of articles published by a given scientist and the numbers of citations of those articles in a single parameter.

== Nuclear war analyses ==
During early 2006 Hirsch argued that "multiple pieces of independent evidence suggest that America is embarked in a premeditated path that will lead inexorably to the use of nuclear weapons against Iran in the very near future" and that "neither the media nor Congress are bringing up the inconvenient little fact that the military option will necessarily lead to the use of nuclear weapons against Iran."

He also speculated that in order to justify an attack on Iran using nuclear weapons, US authorities might make a false, but difficult to disprove, claim that Iranian biologists are trying to develop a strain of the H5N1 avian flu virus which would be transmissible from human to human, and which would be transported to Europe by birds migrating north with the onset of the northern summer of 2006.

In April 2006, Hirsch initiated a letter to President George W. Bush, co-signed by twelve other physicists, warning of the dangers of using tactical nuclear weapons against Iran. The letter, dated April 17, was in response to articles in The New Yorker and The Washington Post that indicated the Pentagon was actively considering such options.
