= Lanthanum decahydride =

Identifiers
CAS Number	1130489-79-0
3D model (JSmol)	Interactive image
- InChI: InChI=1S/La.10H Key: WKJDXOLLSPZSBN-UHFFFAOYSA-N
- SMILES: [LaH10]

Properties
Chemical formula	H_{10}La
Molar mass	148.985 g·mol^{−1}

Structure
Crystal structure	Cubic
Space group	Fm3̅m
Lattice constant	a = 5.1019(5) Å at 150 GPa
Lattice volume (V)	132.80(4) Å^{3}
- Except where otherwise noted, data are given for materials in their standard state (at 25 °C [77 °F], 100 kPa). Infobox references

Lanthanum decahydride is a polyhydride or superhydride compound of lanthanum and hydrogen (LaH_{10}) that has shown evidence of being a high-temperature superconductor. It was the first metal superhydride to be theoretically predicted, synthesized, and experimentally confirmed to superconduct at near room-temperatures. It has a superconducting transition temperature T_{c} around 250 K (−23 °C; −10 °F) at a pressure of 150 GPa (22 million psi), and its synthesis required pressures above approximately 160 GPa (23 million psi).

== Synopsis ==
Since its discovery in 2019, the superconducting properties of LaH_{10} and other lanthanum-based superhydrides have been experimentally confirmed in multiple independent experiments. The compound exhibits a Meissner effect below the superconducting transition temperature. A cubic form can be synthesized at 1,000 K (730 °C; 1,340 °F), and a hexagonal crystal structure can be formed at room temperature. Further reports indicate T_{c} is increased with nitrogen doping, and decreased with the introduction of magnetic impurities.

The cubic form has each lanthanum atom surrounded by 32 hydrogen atoms, which form the vertices of an 18-faced shape called a chamfered cube.

A similar compound, lanthanum boron octahydride, was computationally predicted to be a superconductor at 126 K (−147 °C; −233 °F) and pressure 50 GPa (7.3 million psi).
