= Transition temperature =

In crystallography, the transition temperature is the temperature at which a material changes from one crystal state (allotrope) to another. More formally, it is the temperature at which two crystalline forms of a substance can co-exist in equilibrium. For example, when rhombic sulfur is heated above 95.6 °C, it changes form into monoclinic sulfur; when cooled below 95.6 °C, it reverts to rhombic sulfur. At 95.6 °C the two forms can co-exist. Another example is tin, which transitions from a cubic crystal below 13.2 °C to a tetragonal crystal above that temperature.

In the case of ferroelectric or ferromagnetic crystals, a transition temperature may be known as the Curie temperature.

== See also ==
- Crystal system
