= Superconductor classification =

Different types of superconductors

Superconductors can be classified in accordance with several criteria that depend on physical properties, current understanding, and the expense of cooling them or their material.

== By their magnetic properties ==
- Type I superconductors: those having just one critical field (H_{c}) and changing abruptly from one state to the other when it is reached.
- Type II superconductors: having two critical fields, H_{c1} and H_{c2}, being a perfect superconductor under the lower critical field (H_{c1}) and leaving completely the superconducting state to a normally conducting state above the upper critical field (H_{c2}), being in a mixed state when between the critical fields.
- Type-1.5 superconductors: multicomponent superconductors characterized by two or more coherence lengths.

== By their agreement with conventional models ==
- Conventional superconductors: those which can be fully explained with BCS theory or related theories.
- Unconventional superconductors: those which fail to be explained using such theories, such as:
  - Heavy fermion superconductors

This criterion is useful as BCS theory has successfully explained the properties of conventional superconductors since 1957, yet there have been no satisfactory theories to fully explain unconventional superconductors. In most cases, conventional superconductors are type I, but there are exceptions such as niobium, which is both conventional and type II.

== By their critical temperature ==
- Low-temperature superconductors, or LTS: those whose critical temperature is below 77 K.
- High-temperature superconductors, or HTS: those whose critical temperature is above 77 K.
  - Room-temperature superconductors: those whose critical temperature is above 273 K.

77 K is used as the demarcation point to emphasize whether or not superconductivity in the materials can be achieved with liquid nitrogen (whose boiling point is 77K), which is much more feasible than liquid helium (^{3}He) (an alternative to achieve the temperatures needed to get low-temperature superconductors and ofcourse liquid helium being expensive) which has a boiling point around 4.22 K.

== By material constituents and structure ==
- Some pure elements, such as lead or mercury (but not all, as some never reach the superconducting phase).
  - Some allotropes of carbon, such as fullerenes, nanotubes, or diamond.

Most superconductors made of pure elements are type I (except niobium, technetium, vanadium, silicon, and the above-mentioned carbon allotropes).

- Alloys, such as
  - Niobium-titanium (NbTi), whose superconducting properties were discovered in 1962.
- Ceramics (often insulators in the normal state), which include
  - Cuprates i.e. copper oxides (often layered, not isotropic)
    - The YBCO family, which are several yttrium-barium-copper oxides, especially YBa_{2}Cu_{3}O_{7}. They are arguably the most famous high-temperature superconductors.
  - Nickelates (RNiO_{2} R=Rare earth ion) where Sr-doped infinite-layer nickelate NdNiO_{2} undergo a superconducting transition at 9-15 K. In the family of Ruddlesden-Popper phase analog Nd_{6}Ni_{5}O_{12} (n=5) becomes superconducting at 13 K. Note that this is not a complete list and is a topic of current research.
  - Iron-based superconductors, including the oxypnictides.
  - Magnesium diboride (MgB_{2}), whose critical temperature is 39K, being the conventional superconductor with the highest known temperature.
  - non-cuprate oxides such as BKBO.
- Palladates – palladium compounds.
- others, such as the "metallic" compounds Hg_{3}NbF_{6} and Hg_{3}TaF_{6} which are both superconductors below 7 K (−266.15 °C; −447.07 °F).

== See also ==
- Conventional superconductor
- covalent superconductors
- List of superconductors
- High-temperature superconductivity
- Room temperature superconductor
- Superconductivity
- Technological applications of superconductivity
- Timeline of low-temperature technology
- Type-I superconductor
- Type-II superconductor
- Type-1.5 superconductor
- Heavy fermion superconductor
- Organic superconductor
- Unconventional superconductor
