= List of superconductors =

The table below shows some of the parameters of common superconductors. X:Y means material X doped with element Y, T_{C} is the highest reported transition temperature in kelvins and H_{C} is a critical magnetic field in tesla. "BCS" means whether or not the superconductivity is explained within the BCS theory.

== List ==
Substance	Class	T_{C} (K)	H_{C} (T)	Type	BCS	References
Al	Element	1.20	0.01	I	yes	
Bi	Element	5.3×10^{−4}	5.2×10^{−6}	I	no	(Note: According to, superconductivity in Bi is not compatible with conventional BCS theory because the Fermi energy of Bi is comparable to the phonon energy (Debye frequency).)
Cd	Element	0.52	0.0028	I	yes	
Diamond:B	Element	11.4	4	II	yes	
Ga	Element	1.083	0.0058	I	yes	
Ge:Ga	Element	3.5	1		yes	
Hf	Element	0.165		I	yes	
α-Hg	Element	4.15	0.04	I	yes	
β-Hg	Element	3.95	0.04	I	yes	
In	Element	3.4	0.03	I	yes	
Ir	Element	0.14	0.0016	I	yes	
α-La	Element	4.9		I	yes	
β-La	Element	6.3		I	yes	
Li	Element	4×10^{−4}		I		
Mo	Element	0.92	0.0096	I	yes	
Nb	Element	9.26	0.82	II	yes	
Os	Element	0.65	0.007	I	yes	
Pa	Element	1.4		I	yes	
Pb	Element	7.19	0.08	I	yes	
Re	Element	2.4	0.03	I	yes	
Rh	Element	3.25×10^{−4}	4.9×10^{−6}	I		
Ru	Element	0.49	0.005	I	yes	
Si:B	Element	0.4	0.4	II	yes	
Sn	Element	3.72	0.03	I	yes	
Ta	Element	4.48	0.09	I	yes	
Tc	Element	7.46–11.2	0.04	II	yes	
α-Th	Element	1.37	0.013	I	yes	
Ti	Element	0.39	0.01	I	yes	
Tl	Element	2.39	0.02	I	yes	
α-U	Element	0.68		I	yes	
β-U	Element	1.8		I	yes	
V	Element	5.03	1	II	yes	
α-W	Element	0.015	0.00012	I	yes	
β-W	Element	1–4				
Yb	Element	1.4 (>86 GPa)			no	
Zn	Element	0.855	0.005	I	yes	
Zr	Element	0.55	0.014	I	yes	
Ba_{8}Si_{46}	Clathrate	8.07	0.008	II	yes	
C_{6}Ca	Compound	11.5	0.95	II		
C_{6}Li_{3}Ca_{2}	Compound	11.15		II		
C_{8}K	Compound	0.14		II		
C_{8}KHg	Compound	1.4		II		
C_{6}K	Compound	1.5		II		
C_{3}K	Compound	3.0		II		
C_{3}Li	Compound	<0.35		II		
C_{2}Li	Compound	1.9		II		
C_{3}Na	Compound	2.3–3.8		II		
C_{2}Na	Compound	5.0		II		
C_{8}Rb	Compound	0.025		II		
C_{6}Sr	Compound	1.65		II		
C_{6}Yb	Compound	6.5		II		
Sr_{2}RuO_{4}	Compound	0.93		II		
C_{60}Cs_{2}Rb	Compound	33		II	yes	
C_{60}K_{3}	Compound	19.8	0.013	II	yes	
C_{60}Rb_{X}	Compound	28		II	yes	
C_{60}Cs_{3}	Compound	38				
FeB_{4}	Compound	2.9		II		
InN	Compound	3		II	yes	
In_{2}O_{3}	Compound	3.3	~3	II	yes	
LaB_{6}	Compound	0.45			yes	
MgB_{2}	Compound	39	74	II	yes	
Nb_{3}Al	Compound	18		II	yes	
NbC_{1-x}N_{x}	Compound	17.8	12	II	yes	
Nb_{3}Ge	Compound	23.2	37	II	yes	
NbO	Compound	1.38		II	yes	
NbN	Compound	16		II	yes	
Nb_{3}Sn	Compound	18.3	30	II	yes	
NbTi	Compound	10	15	II	yes	
SiC:B	Compound	1.4	0.008	I	yes	
SiC:Al	Compound	1.5	0.04	II	yes	
TiN	Compound	5.6	5	II	yes	
V_{3}Si	Compound	17				
YB_{6}	Compound	8.4		II	yes	
ZrN	Compound	10			yes	
ZrB_{12}	Compound	6.0		II	yes	
UTe_{2}	Compound	2.10			no	
CuBa_{0.15}La_{1.85}O_{4}	Cuprate	52.5				
YBCO	Cuprate	95	120–250	II	no	
EuBCO	Cuprate	93		II	no	
GdBCO	Cuprate	91		II	no	
BSCCO	Cuprate	104				
HBCCO	Cuprate	135				
SmFeAs(O,F)	Iron-based	55				
CeFeAs(O,F)	Iron-based	41				
LaFeAs(O,F)	Iron-based	26				
LaFeSiH	Iron-based	11				
LaFePO	Iron-based	4				
FeSe:SrTiO_{3}	Iron-based	60-100				
(Ba,K)Fe2As2	Iron-based	38				
NaFeAs	Iron-based	20				
La_{3}Ni_{2}O_{7}	Oxonickelate	80 (>14 GPa)				
H_{3}S	Polyhydride	203 (155 GPa)		II		
LaH_{10}	Polyhydride	250 (150 GPa)				
CaH_{6}	Polyhydride	215 (172 GPa)				
