= Graphite intercalation compound =

Class of chemical compounds

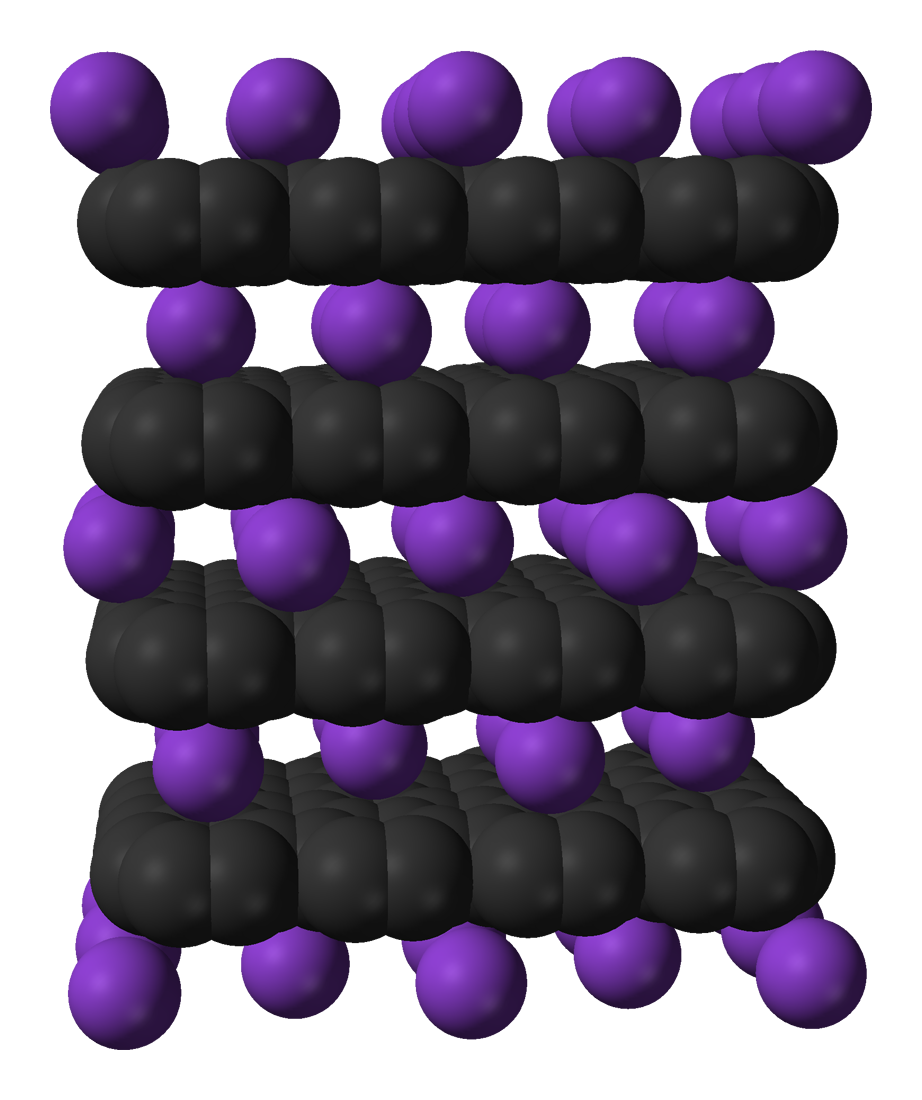
(side view)

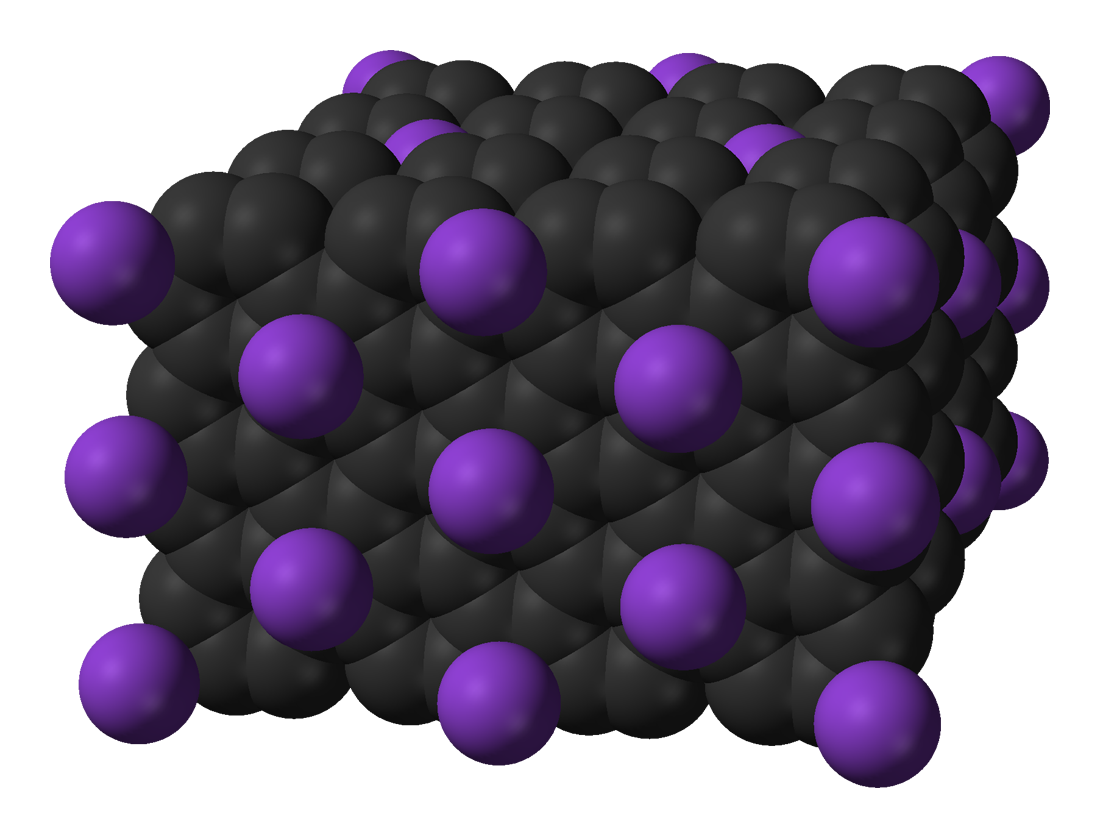
(top view)

Space-filling model of potassium graphite KC_{8}.

In the area of solid state chemistry, graphite intercalation compounds (GICs) are a family of materials prepared from graphite. In particular, the sheets of carbon that comprise graphite can be pried apart by the insertion (intercalation) of ions. The graphite is viewed as a host and the inserted ions as guests. The materials have the formula (guest)C_{n} where n ≥ 6. The insertion of the guests increases the distance between the carbon sheets. Common guests are reducing agents such as alkali metals. Strong oxidants also intercalate into graphite. Intercalation involves electron transfer into or out of the carbon sheets. So, in some sense, graphite intercalation compounds are salts. Intercalation is often reversible: the inserted ions can be removed and the sheets of carbon collapse to a graphite-like structure.

The properties of graphite intercalation compounds differ from those of the parent graphite.

== Preparation and structure ==
These materials are prepared by treating graphite with a strong oxidant or a strong reducing agent:

C + m X → CX_{m}

The reaction is reversible.

The host (graphite) and the guest X interact by charge transfer. An analogous process is the basis of commercial lithium-ion batteries.

In a graphite intercalation compound not every layer is necessarily occupied by guests. In so-called stage 1 compounds, graphite layers and intercalated layers alternate and in stage 2 compounds, two graphite layers with no guest material in between alternate with an intercalated layer. The actual composition may vary and therefore these compounds are an example of non-stoichiometric compounds. It is customary to specify the composition together with the stage. The layers are pushed apart upon incorporation of the guest ions.

== Examples ==
=== Lithium graphite intercalation compound ===
The lithium graphite intercalation compound is the anode active material for nearly all lithium-ion batteries produced today.

Jürgen Otto Besenhard demonstrated in the late 1970's that lithium could be intercalated into graphite as an anode material. Soon after, Samar Basu demonstrated the preparation of lithiated graphite by chemical means. Then, in 1983, Rachid Yazami demonstrated the reversible electrochemical intercalation of lithium in graphite at room temperature using polyethylene oxide solvent. Later, graphite was integrated with cathode materials to form a high voltage lithium-ion battery; see History of the lithium-ion battery for more details.

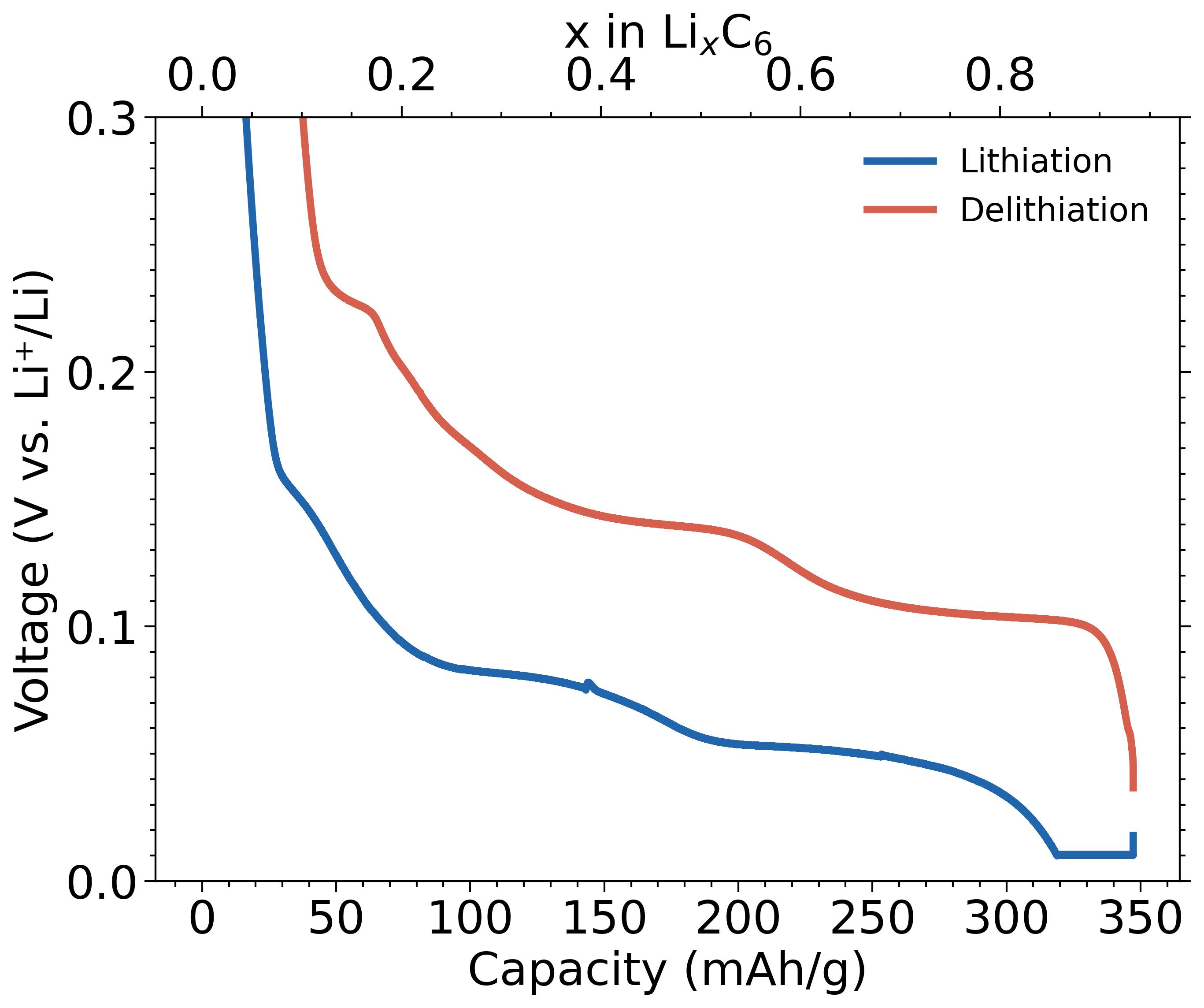
Voltage curve of graphite intercalation in a Li-ion battery versus Li metal.

Graphite undergoes a series of staging corresponding to ordered variations of lithium intercalation into its layers. The LiC_{6} GIC, corresponding to alternating Li and graphene sheets, has a theoretical capacity of 372 mAh/g. This staging behavior is also associated with a change in the color - as Li is intercalated, the color changes from blue, to red, to gold.

=== Other alkali and alkaline earth derivatives ===
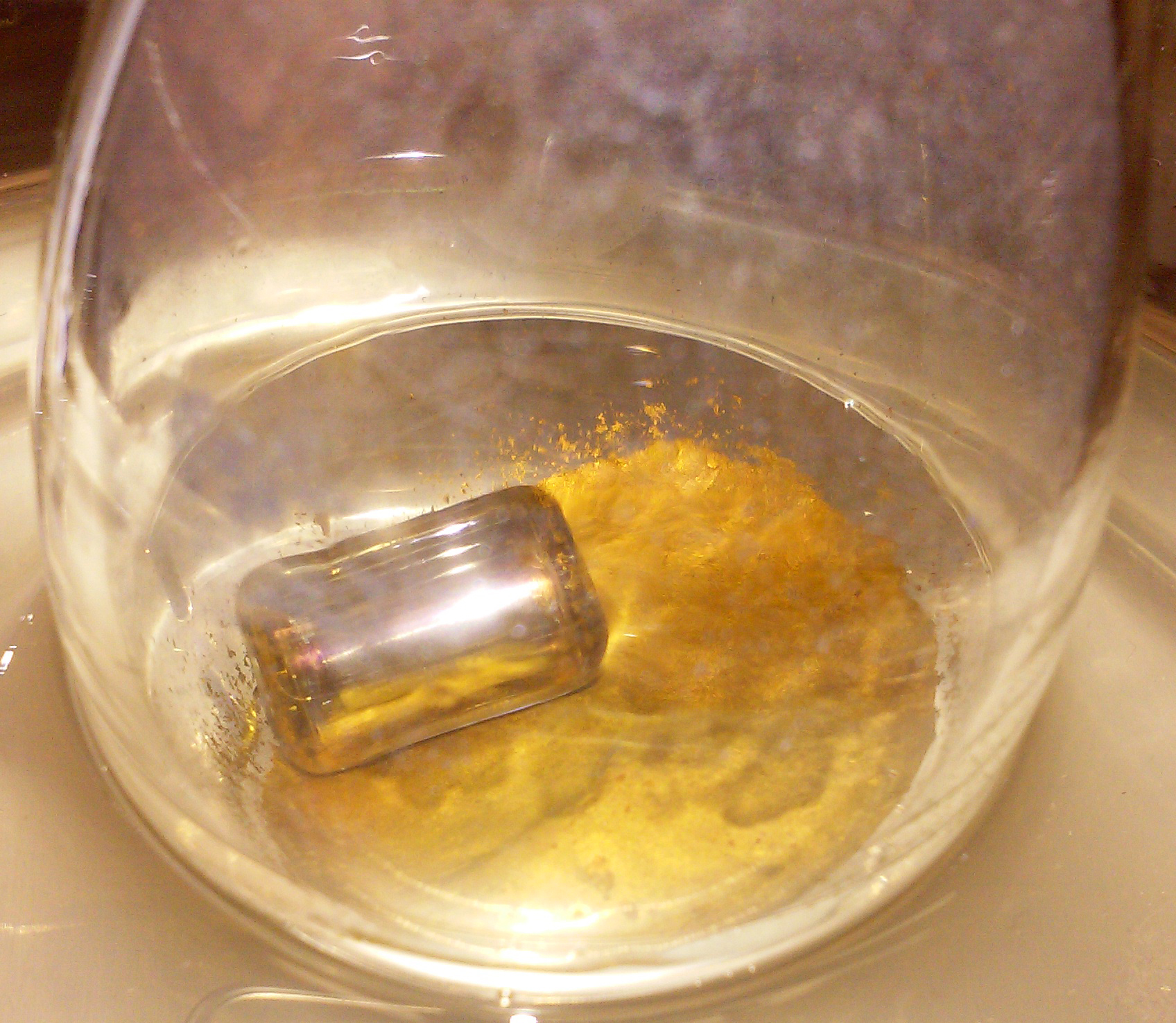
Potassium graphite under argon in a Schlenk flask. A glass-coated magnetic stir bar is also present.

One of the best studied graphite intercalation compounds, KC_{8}, is prepared by melting potassium over graphite powder. The potassium is absorbed into the graphite and the material changes color from black to bronze. The resulting solid is pyrophoric. The composition is explained by assuming that the potassium to potassium distance is twice the distance between hexagons in the carbon framework. The bond between anionic graphite layers and potassium cations is ionic. The electrical conductivity of the material is greater than that of α-graphite. KC_{8} is a superconductor with a very low critical temperature T_{c} = 0.14 K. Heating KC_{8} leads to the formation of a series of decomposition products as the K atoms are eliminated:

3 KC_{8} → KC_{24} + 2 K

Via the intermediates KC_{24} (blue in color), KC_{36}, KC_{48}, ultimately the compound KC_{60} results.

The stoichiometry MC_{8} is observed for M = K, Rb and Cs. For smaller ions M = Li^{+}, Sr^{2+}, Ba^{2+}, Eu^{2+}, Yb^{3+}, and Ca^{2+}, the limiting stoichiometry is MC_{6}. Calcium graphite CaC_{6} is obtained by immersing highly oriented pyrolytic graphite in liquid Li–Ca alloy for 10 days at 350 °C (662 °F). The crystal structure of CaC_{6} belongs to the R3̅m space group. The graphite interlayer distance increases upon Ca intercalation from 3.35 to 4.524 Å, and the carbon-carbon distance increases from 1.42 to 1.444 Å.

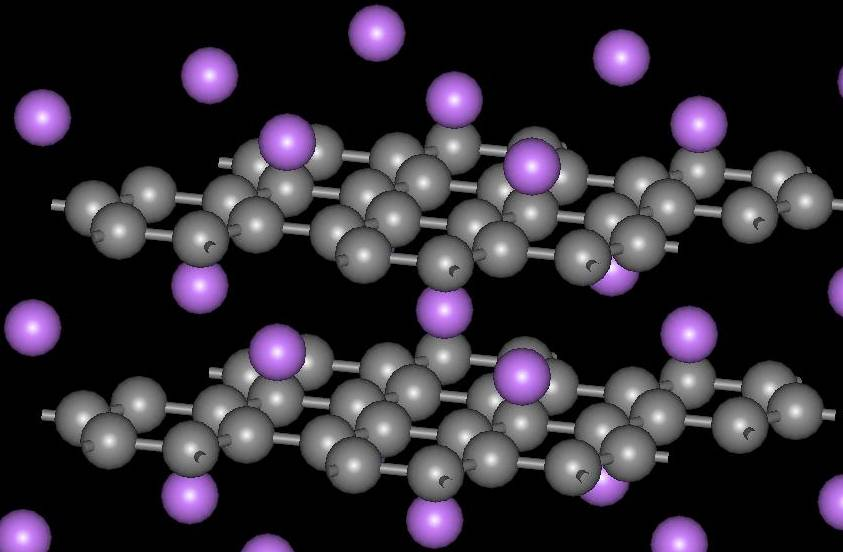
Structure of CaC_{6}

With barium and ammonia, the cations are solvated, giving the stoichiometry (Ba(NH_{3})_{2.5}C_{10.9} (stage 1)) or those with caesium, hydrogen and potassium (CsC_{8}·K_{2}H_{4/3}C_{8} (stage 1)).

In situ adsorption on free-standing graphene and intercalation in bilayer graphene of the alkali metals K, Cs, and Li was observed by means of low-energy electron microscopy.

Different from other alkali metals, the amount of Na intercalation is very small. Quantum-mechanical calculations show that this originates from a quite general phenomenon: among the alkali and alkaline earth metals, Na and Mg generally have the weakest chemical binding to a given substrate, compared with the other elements in the same group of the periodic table. The phenomenon arises from the competition between trends in the ionization energy and the ion–substrate coupling, down the columns of the periodic table. However, considerable Na intercalation into graphite can occur in cases when the ion is wrapped in a solvent shell through the process of co-intercalation. A complex magnesium(I) species has also been intercalated into graphite.

=== Graphite bisulfate, perchlorate, hexafluoroarsenate: oxidized carbons ===
The intercalation compounds graphite bisulfate and graphite perchlorate can be prepared by treating graphite with strong oxidizing agents in the presence of strong acids. In contrast to the potassium and calcium graphites, the carbon layers are oxidized in this process:

48 C + O + 6 H_{2}SO_{4} → 2 ([C_{24}]^{+}[HSO_{4}]^{−}·2H_{2}SO_{4}) + H_{2}O

In graphite perchlorate, planar layers of carbon atoms are 794 picometers apart, separated by ClO^{−}_{4} ions. Cathodic reduction of graphite perchlorate is analogous to heating KC_{8}, which leads to a sequential elimination of HClO_{4}.

Both graphite bisulfate and graphite perchlorate are better conductors as compared to graphite, as predicted by using a positive-hole mechanism. Reaction of graphite with [O_{2}]^{+}[AsF_{6}]^{−} affords the salt [C_{8}]^{+}[AsF_{6}]^{−}.

=== Metal halide derivatives ===
A number of metal halides intercalate into graphite. The chloride derivatives have been most extensively studied. Examples include MCl_{2} (M = Zn, Ni, Cu, Mn), MCl_{3} (M = Al, Fe, Ga), MCl_{4} (M = Zr, Pt), etc. The materials consists of layers of close-packed metal halide layers between sheets of carbon. The derivative C_{~8}FeCl_{3} exhibits spin glass behavior. It proved to be a particularly fertile system on which to study phase transitions. A stage n magnetic graphite intercalation compounds has n graphite layers separating successive magnetic layers. As the stage number increases the interaction between spins in successive magnetic layers becomes weaker and 2D magnetic behaviour may arise.

=== Halogen- and oxide-graphite compounds ===
Chlorine and bromine reversibly intercalate into graphite. Iodine does not. Fluorine reacts irreversibly. In the case of bromine, the following stoichiometries are known: C_{n}Br for n = 8, 12, 14, 16, 20, and 28.

Because it forms irreversibly, carbon monofluoride is often not classified as an intercalation compound. It has the formula (CF)_{x}. It is prepared by reaction of gaseous fluorine with graphitic carbon at 215–230 °C (419–446 °F). The color is greyish, white, or yellow. The bond between the carbon and fluorine atoms is covalent. Tetracarbon monofluoride (C_{4}F) is prepared by treating graphite with a mixture of fluorine and hydrogen fluoride at room temperature. The compound has a blackish-blue color. Carbon monofluoride is not electrically conductive. It has been studied as a cathode material in one type of primary (non-rechargeable) lithium batteries.

Graphite oxide is an unstable yellow solid.

== Properties and applications ==
Graphite intercalation compounds have fascinated materials scientists for many years owing to their diverse electronic and electrical properties.

=== Superconductivity ===
Among the superconducting graphite intercalation compounds, CaC_{6} exhibits the highest critical temperature T_{c} = 11.5 K, which further increases under applied pressure (15.1 K at 8 GPa (79,000 atm)). Superconductivity in these compounds is thought to be related to the role of an interlayer state, a free electron like band lying roughly 2 eV (0.32 aJ) above the Fermi level; superconductivity only occurs if the interlayer state is occupied. Analysis of pure CaC_{6} using a high quality ultraviolet light revealed to conduct angle-resolved photoemission spectroscopy measurements. The opening of a superconducting gap in the π* band revealed a substantial contribution to the total electron–phonon-coupling strength from the π*-interlayer interband interaction.

=== Reagents in chemical synthesis: KC_{8} ===
The bronze-colored material KC_{8} is one of the strongest reducing agents known. It has also been used as a catalyst in polymerizations and as a coupling reagent for aryl halides to biphenyls. In one study, freshly prepared KC_{8} was treated with 1-iodododecane delivering a modification (micrometre scale carbon platelets with long alkyl chains sticking out providing solubility) that is soluble in chloroform. Another potassium graphite compound, KC_{24}, has been used as a neutron monochromator. A new essential application for potassium graphite was introduced by the invention of the potassium-ion battery. Like the lithium-ion battery, the potassium-ion battery should use a carbon-based anode instead of a metallic anode. In this circumstance, the stable structure of potassium graphite is an important advantage.

== See also ==
- Buckminsterfullerene intercalates
- Covalent superconductors
- Magnesium diboride, which uses hexagonal planar boron sheets instead of carbon
- Pyrolytic graphite
