= Type-1.5 superconductor =

Multicomponent superconductors characterized by two or more coherence lengths

Type-1.5 superconductors are multicomponent superconductors characterized by two or more coherence lengths, at least one of which is shorter than the magnetic field penetration length $\lambda$, and at least one of which is longer. This is in contrast to single-component superconductors, where there is only one coherence length $\xi$ and the superconductor is necessarily either type 1 ($\xi > \lambda$) or type 2 ($\xi < \lambda$) (often a coherence length is defined with extra $2^{1/2}$ factor, with such a definition the corresponding inequalities are $\xi >\sqrt{2} \lambda$ and $\xi <\sqrt{2} \lambda$). When placed in magnetic field, type-1.5 superconductors should form quantum vortices: magnetic-flux-carrying excitations. They allow magnetic field to pass through superconductors due to a vortex-like circulation of superconducting particles (electronic pairs). In type-1.5 superconductors these vortices have long-range attractive, short-range repulsive interaction. As a consequence a type-1.5 superconductor in a magnetic field can form a phase separation into domains with expelled magnetic field and clusters of quantum vortices which are bound together by attractive intervortex forces. The domains of the Meissner state retain the two-component superconductivity, while in the vortex clusters one of the superconducting components is suppressed. Thus such materials should allow coexistence of various properties of type-I and type-II superconductors.

== Description ==
Type-I superconductors completely expel external magnetic fields if the strength of the applied field is sufficiently low. Also the supercurrent can flow only on the surface of such a superconductor but not in its interior. This state is called the Meissner state. However at elevated magnetic field, when the magnetic field energy becomes comparable with the superconducting condensation energy, the superconductivity is destroyed by the formation of macroscopically large inclusions of non-superconducting phase.

Type-II superconductors, besides the Meissner state, possess another state: a sufficiently strong applied magnetic field can produce currents in the interior of superconductor due to formation of quantum vortices. The vortices also carry magnetic flux through the interior of the superconductor. These quantum vortices repel each other and thus tend to form uniform vortex lattices or liquids. Formally, vortex solutions exist also in models of type-I superconductivity, but the interaction between vortices is purely attractive, so a system of many vortices is unstable against a collapse onto a state of a single giant normal domain with supercurrent flowing on its surface. More importantly, the vortices in type-I superconductor are energetically unfavorable. To produce them would require the application of a magnetic field stronger than what a superconducting condensate can sustain. Thus a type-I superconductor goes to non-superconducting states rather than forming vortices. In the usual Ginzburg–Landau theory, only the quantum vortices with purely repulsive interaction are energetically cheap enough to be induced by applied magnetic field.

It was proposed that the type-I/type-II dichotomy could be broken in a multi-component superconductors, which possess multiple coherence lengths.

Examples of multi-component superconductivity are multi-band superconductors magnesium diboride and oxypnictides and exotic superconductors with nontrivial Cooper-pairing. There, one can distinguish two or more superconducting components associated, for example with electrons belong to different bands band structure. A different example of two component systems is the projected superconducting states of liquid metallic hydrogen or deuterium where mixtures of superconducting electrons and superconducting protons or deuterons were theoretically predicted.

It was also pointed out that systems which have phase transitions between different superconducting states such as between $s$ and $s+is$ or between $U(1)$ and $U(1)\times U(1)$ should rather generically fall into type-1.5 state near that transition due to divergence of one of the coherence lengths.

Summary of the properties of type-1.5 superconductor
	Type-I superconductor	Type-II superconductor	Type-1.5 superconductor
Characteristic length scales	The characteristic magnetic field variation length scale (London penetration depth) is smaller than the characteristic length scale of condensate density variation (superconducting coherence length) $\sqrt{2}\lambda<\xi$	The characteristic magnetic field variation length scale (London penetration depth) is larger than the characteristic length scale of the condensate density variation (superconducting coherence length) $\sqrt{2}\lambda> \xi$	Two characteristic length scales of condensate density variation $\xi_1$, $\xi_2$. Characteristic magnetic field variation length scale is smaller than one of the characteristic length scales of density variation and larger than another characteristic length scale of density variation $\xi_1<\sqrt{2}\lambda<\xi_2$
Intervortex interaction	Attractive	Repulsive	Attractive at long range and repulsive at short range
Phases in magnetic field of a clean bulk superconductor	(1) Meissner state at low fields; (2) Macroscopically large normal domains at larger fields. First-order phase transition between the states (1) and (2)	(1) Meissner state at low fields, (2) vortex lattices/liquids at larger fields.	(1) Meissner state at low fields (2) "Semi-Meissner state": vortex clusters coexisting with Meissner domains at intermediate fields (3) Vortex lattices/liquids at larger fields.
Phase transitions	First-order phase transition between the states (1) and (2)	Second-order phase transition between the states (1) and (2) and second-order phase transition between from the state (2) to normal state	First-order phase transition between the states (1) and (2) and second-order phase transition between from the state (2) to normal state.
Energy of Superconducting/normal boundary	Positive	Negative	Negative energy of superconductor/normal interface inside a vortex cluster, positive energy at the boundary of vortex cluster
Weakest magnetic field required to form a vortex	Larger than thermodynamical critical magnetic field	Smaller than thermodynamical critical magnetic field	In some cases larger than critical magnetic field for single vortex but smaller than critical magnetic field for a vortex cluster
Energy E(N) of N-quanta axially symmetric vortex solutions	E(N)/N < E(N–1)/(N–1) for all N, i.e. N-quanta vortex does not decay in 1-quanta vortices	E(N)/N > E(N–1)/(N–1) for all N, i.e. N-quanta vortex decays in 1-quanta vortices	There is a characteristic number of flux quanta N_{c} such that E(N)/N < E(N–1)/(N–1) for N<N_{c} and E(N)/N > E(N–1)/(N–1) for N>N_{c}, N-quanta vortex decays into vortex cluster

=== In mixtures of independently conserved condensates ===
For multicomponent superconductors with so called U(1)xU(1) symmetry the Ginzburg-Landau model is a sum of two single-component Ginzburg-Landau model which are coupled by a vector potential $A$ :

$F=\sum_{i,j=1,2}\frac{1}{2m} |(\nabla - ie A) \psi_i|^2 + \alpha_i |\psi_i|^2 + \beta_i|\psi_i|^4 +\frac{1}{2}(\nabla \times A)^2$

where $\psi_i = |\psi_i| e^{i \phi_i}, i=1,2$ are two superconducting condensates. In case if the condensates are coupled only electromagnetically, i.e. by $A$ the model has three length scales: the London penetration length $\lambda = \frac{1}{e\sqrt{|\psi_1|^2 + |\psi_2|^2}}$ and two coherence lengths $\xi_1=\frac{1}{\sqrt{2\alpha_1}},\xi_2=\frac{1}{\sqrt{2\alpha_2}}$. The vortex excitations in that case have cores in both components which are co-centered because of electromagnetic coupling mediated by the field $A$. The necessary but not sufficient condition for occurrence of type-1.5 regime is $\xi_1 >\lambda>\xi_2$. Additional condition of thermodynamic stability is satisfied for a range of parameters. These vortices have a nonmonotonic interaction: they attract each other at large distances and repel each other at short distances. It was shown that there is a range of parameters where these vortices are energetically favorable enough to be excitable by an external field, attractive interaction notwithstanding. This results in the formation of a special superconducting phase in low magnetic fields dubbed "Semi-Meissner" state. The vortices, whose density is controlled by applied magnetic flux density, do not form a regular structure. Instead, they should have a tendency to form vortex "droplets" because of the long-range attractive interaction caused by condensate density suppression in the area around the vortex. Such vortex clusters should coexist with the areas of vortex-less two-component Meissner domains. Inside such vortex cluster the component with larger coherence length is suppressed: so that component has appreciable current only at the boundary of the cluster.

=== In multiband systems ===
In a two-band superconductor the electrons in different bands are not independently conserved thus the definition of two superconducting components is different. A two-band superconductor is described by the following Ginzburg-Landau model.

$F=\sum_{i,j=1,2}\frac{1}{2m} |(\nabla - ie A) \psi_i|^2 + \alpha_i |\psi_i|^2 + \beta_i|\psi_i|^4 - \eta( \psi_1\psi_2^* + \psi_1^*\psi_2) + \gamma [(\nabla - ie A) \psi_1 \cdot (\nabla + ie A) \psi_2^* + (\nabla + ie A) \psi_1^* \cdot (\nabla - ie A) \psi_2] + \nu |\psi_1|^2|\psi_2|^2 +\frac{1}{2}(\nabla \times A)^2$

where again $\psi_i = |\psi_i| e^{i \phi_i}, i=1,2$ are two superconducting condensates. In multiband superconductors quite generically $\eta\ne 0, \gamma \ne 0$. When $\eta\ne 0, \gamma \ne 0, \nu \ne 0$ three length scales of the problem are again the London penetration length and two coherence lengths. However, in this case the coherence lengths $\tilde{\xi}_1(\alpha_1,\beta_1,\alpha_2,\beta_2,\eta,\gamma,\nu),\tilde{\xi}_2(\alpha_1,\beta_1,\alpha_2,\beta_2,\eta,\gamma,\nu)$ are associated with "mixed" combinations of density fields.

== Microscopic models ==
A microscopic theory of type-1.5 superconductivity has been reported.

== Current experimental research ==
In 2009, experimental results have been reported claiming that magnesium diboride may fall into this new class of superconductivity. The term type-1.5 superconductor was coined for this state. Further experimental data backing this conclusion was reported in. More recent theoretical works show that the type-1.5 may be more general phenomenon because it does not require a material with two truly superconducting bands, but can also happen as a result of even very small interband proximity effect and is robust in the presence of various inter-band couplings such as interband Josephson coupling. In 2014, experimental study suggested that Sr_{2}RuO_{4} is type-1.5 superconductor.

== Non-technical explanation ==
Type-I and type-II superconductors feature dramatically different charge flow patterns. Type-I superconductors have two state-defining properties: The lack of electric resistance and the fact that they do not allow an external magnetic field to pass through them. When a magnetic field is applied to these materials, superconducting electrons produce a strong current on the surface, which in turn produces a magnetic field in the opposite direction to cancel the interior magnetic field, similar to how typical conductors cancel interior electric fields with surface charge distributions. An externally applied magnetic field of sufficiently low strength is cancelled in the interior of a type-I superconductor by the field produced by the surface current. In type-II superconducting materials, however, a complicated flow of superconducting electrons can form deep in the interior of the material. In a type-II material, magnetic fields can penetrate into the interior, carried inside by vortices that form an Abrikosov vortex lattice.

In type-1.5 superconductors, there are at least two superconducting components. In such materials, the external magnetic field can produce clusters of tightly packed vortex droplets because in such materials vortices should attract each other at large distances and repel at short length scales. Since the attraction originates in vortex core's overlaps in one of the superconducting components, this component will be depleted in the vortex cluster. Thus a vortex cluster will represent two competing types of superflow. One component will form vortices bunched together while the second component will produce supercurrent flowing on the surface of vortex clusters in a way similar to how electrons flow on the exterior of type-I superconductors. These vortex clusters are separated by "voids," with no vortices, no currents and no magnetic field.

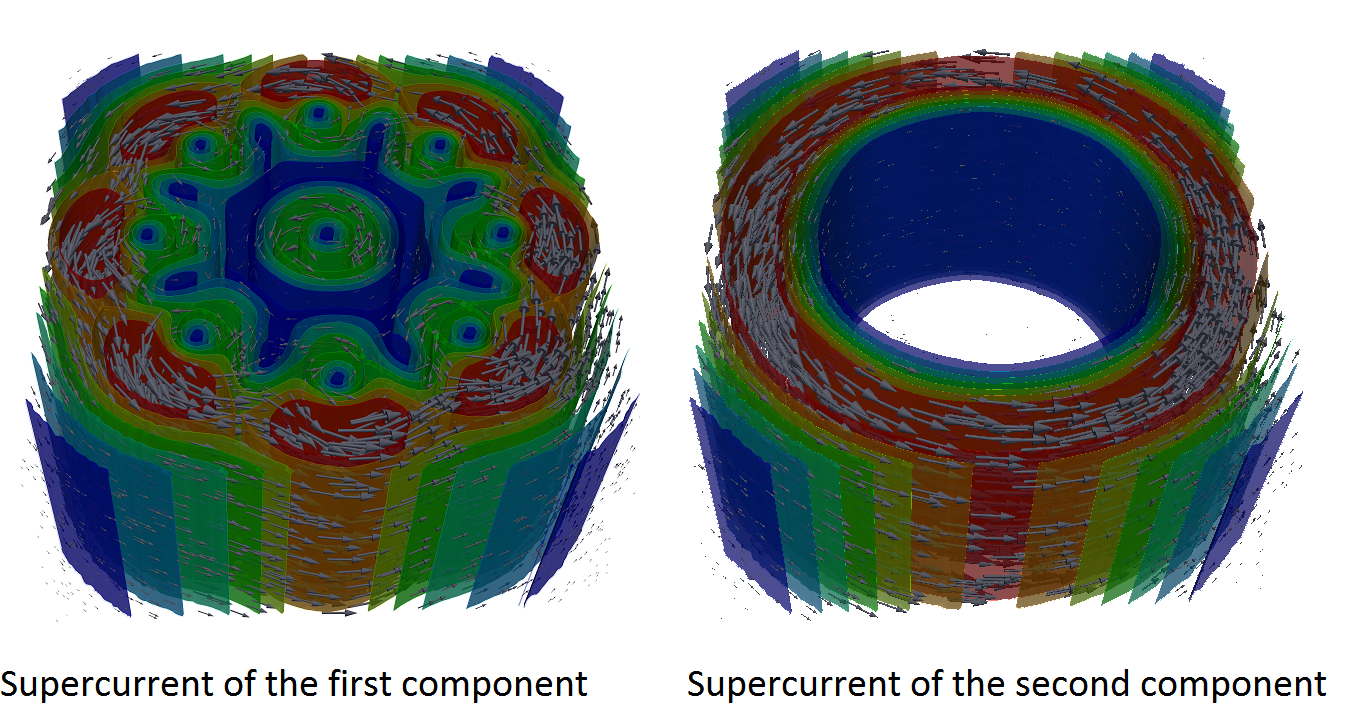

== Animations ==
Movies from numerical simulations of the Semi-Meissner state where Meissner domains coexist with clusters where vortex droplets form in one superconducting components and macroscopic normal domains in the other.
