= Hybrid physical–chemical vapor deposition =

Thin-film deposition technique

The reactor chamber of laboratory-scale hybrid physical–chemical vapor deposition (HPCVD) system at Pennsylvania State University, US. The stainless steel susceptor sits on a quartz rod inside the water-cooled chamber. During deposition, it will be heated up by the inductive heating coil (copper tubing outside the chamber). The silicon carbide (SiC) substrate and magnesium pellets are on the top of the susceptor.

Hybrid physical–chemical vapor deposition (HPCVD) is a thin-film deposition technique, that combines physical vapor deposition (PVD) with chemical vapor deposition (CVD).

For the instance of magnesium diboride (MgB_{2}) thin-film growth, HPCVD process uses diborane (B_{2}H_{6}) as the boron precursor gas, but unlike conventional CVD, which only uses gaseous sources, heated bulk magnesium pellets (99.95% pure) are used as the Mg source in the deposition process. Since the process involves chemical decomposition of precursor gas and physical evaporation of metal bulk, it is named as hybrid physical–chemical vapor deposition.

== System configuration ==
The HPCVD system usually consists of a water-cooled reactor chamber, gas inlet and flow control system, pressure maintenance system, temperature control system and gas exhaust and cleaning system.

The main difference between HPCVD and other CVD systems is in the heating unit. For HPCVD, both substrate and solid metal source are heated up by the heating module. The conventional HPCVD system usually has only one heater. The substrate and solid metal source sit on the same susceptor and are heated up inductively or resistively at the same time. Above certain temperature, the bulk metal source melts and generates a high vapor pressure in the vicinity of the substrate. Then the precursor gas is introduced into the chamber and decomposes around the substrate at high temperature. The atoms from the decomposed precursor gas react with the metal vapor, forming thin films on the substrate. The deposition ends when the precursor gas is switched off. The main drawback of single heater setup is the metal source temperature and the substrate temperature cannot be controlled independently. Whenever the substrate temperature is changed, the metal vapor pressure changes as well, limiting the ranges of the growth parameters. In the two-heater HPCVD arrangement, the metal source and substrate are heated up by two separate heaters. Thus it can provide more flexible control of growth parameters.

== Magnesium diboride thin films by HPCVD ==
HPCVD has been the most effective technique for depositing magnesium diboride (MgB_{2}) thin films. Other MgB_{2} deposition technologies either have a reduced superconducting transition temperature and poor crystallinity, or require ex situ annealing in Mg vapor. The surfaces of these MgB_{2} films are rough and non-stoichiometric. Instead, HPCVD system can grow high-quality in situ pure MgB_{2} films with smooth surfaces, which are required to make reproducible uniform Josephson junctions, the fundamental element of superconducting circuits.

=== Principle ===
From the theoretical phase diagram of Mg-B system, a high Mg vapor pressure is required for the thermodynamic phase stability of MgB_{2} at elevated temperature. MgB_{2} is a line compound and as long as the Mg/B ratio is above the stoichiometric 1:2, any extra Mg at elevated temperature will be in the gas phase and be evacuated. Also, once MgB_{2} is formed, it has to overcome a significant kinetic barrier to thermally decompose. So one does not have to be overly concerned about maintaining a high Mg vapor pressure during the cooling stage of the MgB_{2} film deposition.

=== Pure films ===
During the growth process of magnesium diboride thin films by HPCVD, the carrier gas is purified hydrogen gas H_{2} at a pressure of about 100 Torr. This H_{2} environment prevents oxidation during the deposition. Bulk pure Mg pieces are placed next to the substrate on the top of the susceptor. When the susceptor is heated to about 650 °C, pure Mg pieces are also heated, which generates a high Mg vapor pressure in the vicinity of the substrate. Diborane (B_{2}H_{6}) is used as the boron source. MgB_{2} films starts to grow when the boron precursor gas B_{2}H_{6} is introduced into the reactor chamber. The growth rate of the MgB_{2} film is controlled by the flow rate of B_{2}H_{6}/H_{2} mixture. The film growth stops when the boron precursor gas is switched off.

=== Carbon-alloyed films ===
To improve the performance of superconducting magnesium diboride thin films in magnetic field, it is desirable to dope impurities into the films. The HPCVD technique is also an efficient method to grow carbon-doped or carbon-alloyed MgB_{2} thin films. The carbon-alloyed MgB_{2} films can be grown in the same way as the pure MgB_{2} films deposition process described above except adding a metalorganic magnesium precursor, bis(methylcyclopentadienyl)magnesium precursor, into the carrier gas. The carbon-alloyed MgB_{2} thin films by HPCVD exhibit extraordinarily high upper critical field (H_{c2}). H_{c2} over 60 T at low temperatures is observed when the magnetic field is parallel to the ab-plane.

== See also ==
- Chemical vapor deposition
- Physical vapor deposition
