= Classical superconductor =

Classical superconductor may refer to:

- In the context of classical electrodynamics or general physics: a perfect conductor with no special quantum mechanical properties. No such substances are known to exist, but they are useful simplifications of certain systems such as magnetohydrodynamics and electrical circuits.
- In the context of high-temperature superconductivity: a conventional superconductor.
