= Oxyarsenides =

Class of chemical compounds

Oxyarsenides or arsenide oxides are chemical compounds formally containing the group AsO, with one arsenic and one oxygen atom. The arsenic and oxygen are not bound together as in arsenates or arsenites, instead they make a separate presence bound to the cations (metals), and could be considered as a mixed arsenide-oxide compound. So a compound with O_{m}As_{n} requires cations to balance a negative charge of 2m+3n. The cations will have charges of +2 or +3. The trications are often rare earth elements or actinides. They are in the category of oxypnictide compounds.

Some of these compounds are superconductors, but may require doping with fluoride or oxygen deficiency. Yet others undergo colossal magnetoresistance with a lowered electrical resistance in a magnetic field.

Many compounds are layered, containing two metals with the formula XZAsO, with an XAs layer alternating with a ZO layer.

== Examples ==
| formula | name | mw | structure | space group | cell | appearance | properties | supercondicting T_{c} | reference |
|---|---|---|---|---|---|---|---|---|---|
| Sr_{2}Cr_{3}As_{2}O_{3} | | | tetragonal | P4/mmm | a=4.04032 c=9.33140 V=152.327 | | | | |
| Sr_{2}Cr_{2}AsO_{3} | | | tetragonal | P4/nmm | a=3.90988 c=16.05417 C=245.422 | | | | |
| Sr_{2}Mn_{3}As_{2}O_{2} | | | | | a=4.1459 c=18.856 | | | | |
| Sr_{2}Cr_{1.85}Mn_{1.15}As_{2}O_{2} | | | tetragonal | I4/mmm | a = 4.043788 c 18.9977 Z=2 V=310.654 | | | | |
| Sr_{2}CrO_{3}FeAs | | | tetragonal | | | | | | |
| Sr_{2}CrO_{3}CrAs | | | | P4/nmm | a=3.90988 c=16.05417 V=245.422 | | | | |
| Sr_{2}CrO_{2}Cr_{2}OAs_{2} | | | | P4/mmm | a=4.04032 c=9.33140 V=152.327 | | | | |
| Sr_{2}MnZn_{2}As_{2}O_{2} | | | | | a=4.12624 c=18.6709 | | | | |
| YFeAsO | yttrium iron oxyarsenide | | tetragonal | | | | ferromagnetic 62K | | |
| Ba_{2}Ti_{2}OAs_{2}Cr_{2}As_{2} | | | tetragonal | I4/nmm | a=4.0391 c=27.8474 | | | | |
| Ba_{2}Ti_{2}Fe_{2}As_{4}O | | | tetragonal | I4/nmm | | | | superconductor | |
| BaTi_{2}As_{2}O | | | tetragonal | I4/nmm | a = 4.047 c = 7.275 | | density wave at 200K | | |
| Ba_{2}MnZn_{2}As_{2}O_{2} | | | tetragonal | P4/nmm | a=4.23369 c=19.5087 | | | | |
| LaMnAsO | | | | | | | | | |
| LaCoAsO | | | | | | | | | |
| LaFeAsO_{1−x}F_{x} | fluorine doped Lanthanum iron oxyarsenide | | tetragonal | | | | | 26K | |
| LaNiOAs | Lanthanum Nickel oxyarsenide | | tetragonal | P4/nmm | | metallic | | 2.4 | |
| PrFeAsO | Praseodymium iron oxyarsenide | | | | | | | | |
| NdMnAsO | | | | | | | | | |
| NdMnAsO_{0.95}F_{0.05} | | | | | a=4.04870 c=8.89654 | | | | |
| NdFeAsO | Neodymium iron oxyarsenide | | | | | | | | |
| Nd_{0.9}Sr_{0.1}MsAsO | | | | | | | | | |
| SmFeAsO_{0.9}F_{0.1} | Samarium iron oxyarsenide | | tetragonal | | | | | 55K | |
| TbFeAsO | Terbium iron oxyarsenide | | tetragonal | | | | | superconducting | |
| TbFeAsO_{0.85} | | | tetragonal | | a = 3.889 Å b = 8.376 | | | 42 | |
| TbRuAsO | terbium ruthenium arsenide oxide | 350.95 | tetragonal | P4/nmm | a= 4.0254 c=8.0710 V=130.782 Z=2 | grey | | | |
| DyRuAsO | dysprosium ruthenium arsenide oxide | 354.49 | tetragonal | P4/nmm | a=4.01728 c=8.03272 V=129.637 Z=2 | grey | | | |
| DyRuAsO | dysprosium ruthenium arsenide oxide | 354.49 | orthorhombic | | a=4.02033 b=4.00791 c=8.0048 V=128.983 Z=2 | | at 12K | | |
| Gd_{0.8}Th_{0.2}FeAsO | thorium doped gadolinium iron oxyarsenide | | tetragonal | | | | | 55K | |
| U_{2}Cu_{2}As_{3}O | diuranium dicopper oxytriarsenide | | | P4/nmm | a = 3.9111 Å c = 17.916 Z=2 | | | | |

== Related ==
Related compounds include the oxynitrides, oxyphosphides, oxyantimonides and oxybismuthides.
