= Microwave heat distribution =

Allocation of the heat release inside the microwave absorptive material

The microwave heat distribution is the distribution (allocation) of the heat release inside the microwave absorptive material irradiated with high intensive microwaves. The pattern of microwave heat distribution depends on many physical parameters, which may include the electromagnetic field, the specific absorption rate and structure of the processed material, the geometrical dimensions of the processing cavity, etc.
Most of the industrial microwave heating applications need a uniform heat distribution. For example, the uniformity of microwave heat distribution is key parameter in microwave food sterilization, due to the potential danger directly related to human health if the food has not been heated evenly up to desirable temperature for neutralization of possible bacteria population.
There are many different methods for achieving uniform heat distribution inside the irradiated material. They may involve computer simulation and different mechanical mechanisms such as turntables and stirrers. The proper microwave energy pattern is necessary for attaining a uniform heat release.

== See also ==
- Susceptor

A hybrid technique for computing the power distribution generated in a lossy medium during microwave heating
