= Oxyphosphides =

Class of chemical compounds

Oxyphosphides are chemical compounds formally containing the group PO, with one phosphorus and one oxygen atom. The phosphorus and oxygen are not bound together as in phosphates or phosphine oxides, instead they are bound separately to the cations (metals), and could be considered as a mixed phosphide-oxide compound. So a compound with O_{m}P_{n} requires cations to balance a negative charge of 2m+3n. The cations will have charges of +2 or +3. The trications are often rare earth elements or actinides. They are in the category of oxy-pnictide compounds.

Many compounds are layered, containing two metals with the formula XZPO, with an XP layer alternating with a ZO layer.

== Examples ==
Examples include

- Ca_{4}P_{2}O greenish gold, has space group I4mmm Z=2 and unit cell parameters a = 4.492, c = 15.087.
- Uranium–Copper Oxyphosphide UCuPO semimetallic antiferromagnetic tetragonal ZrCuSiAs-type a =3:7958 c=8:2456 V=118.80 Z=2 MW=348.55 density=9.743
- Thorium–Copper Oxyphosphide ThCuPO semimetallic tetragonal ZrCuSiAs-type a=3.8995 c=8.2939 V=126.12 Z=2 MW=342.56 density=9.02.
- NpCuOP
- Sr_{2}ScCoPO_{3} high thermoelectric effect
- Sr_{2}ScFePO_{3} superconducting 17K.
- LaNiOP Lanthanum nickel oxyphosphide
- YOFeP
- YOMnP
- YOCdP
- ROTPn (R = La, Nd, Sm, Gd; T = Mn, Fe, Co, Ni, Cu; Pn = P, As, Sb)
- YZnPO transparent red R3̅m Z=6 a = 3.946, c = 30.71
- LaZnPO transparent red ZrCuSiAs type
- DyZnPO transparent red R3̅m Z=6 a=3.8933 c=30.305
- PrZnPO transparent red dimorphic
- SmZnPO transparent red R3̅m Z=6 a = 3.946, c = 30.71
- NdZnPO transparent a = 3.885 c = 30.32
- GdZnPO transparent red R3̅m Z=6 a=3.922, c = 30.56
- CeZnPO transparent
- HoZnPO transparent dark red
- CeRuPO ferromagnetic below 15K. dimorphic
- CeOsPO antiferromagnetic

== related phosphide oxides ==
- La_{2}AuP_{2}O C2/m, a=15.373 b=4.274 c=10.092 β=131.02 V=500.3 dark-red-violet
- Ce_{2}AuP_{2}O C2/m, a = 15.152, b = 4.2463, c = 9.992 pm, β = 130.90° dark-red-violet
- Pr_{2}AuP_{2}O C2/m, a = 15.036, b = 4.228, c = 9.930 pm, β = 130.88(2)° dark-red-violet
- Nd_{2}AuP_{2}O C2/m, a = 15.0187, b = 4.2085, c = 9.903 pm, β = 131.12(1)° dark-red-violet

== Oxy-pnictides ==
Related compounds are the oxybismuthides and oxyarsenides.
