= Iron-based superconductor =

Type of superconductor

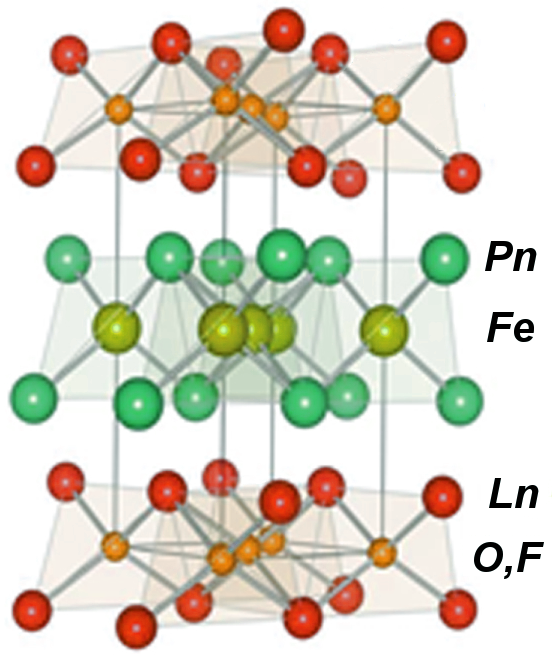
Crystal structure of LnFeAsOF, a 1111-type ferropnictide compound. Ln = lanthanide (La, Ce, Yb, Nd, Gd, Sm, etc.), Pn = pnictide (As, P, N, Bi, etc.)

Iron-based superconductors (FeSC) are iron-containing chemical compounds whose superconducting properties were discovered in 2006. The 2006 LaOFeP report involved a low transition temperature, whereas the 2008 fluorine-doped LaFeAsO compound reached 26 K and established oxypnictides as the starting point for the iron-pnictide superconductor family. These first superconducting compounds belonged to the group of oxypnictides, which was known since 1995. Until 2006, however, they were in the first stages of experimentation and implementation and only the semiconductive properties of these compounds were known and patented. Scientific American described subsequent research as follows:

The crystalline material, known chemically as LaOFeAs, stacks iron and arsenic layers, where the electrons flow, between planes of lanthanum and oxygen. Replacing up to 11 percent of the oxygen with fluorine improved the compound – it became superconductive at 26 kelvin, the team reports in the March 19, 2008 Journal of the American Chemical Society. Subsequent research from other groups suggests that replacing the lanthanum in LaOFeAs with other rare earth elements such as cerium, samarium, neodymium and praseodymium leads to superconductors that work at 52 kelvin.

Previously most high-temperature superconductors were cuprates containing copper - oxygen layers. Much of the interest in iron-based superconductors is precisely because of the differences from the cuprates, which may help lead to a theory of non-BCS-theory superconductivity.

Iron-based superconductors of the group of oxypnictides were initially called ferropnictides. The crystal structure of these compounds displays conducting layers of iron and a pnictogen (typically arsenic (As) and phosphorus (P)) separated by a charge-reservoir block. It has also been found that some iron chalcogens and crystallogens superconduct.

Iron-based superconductors are classified according to their crystal structure and chemical formula into the following main families,

- 1111-type, with representative compounds LaFePO, LaFeAsO, SmFeAsO, PrFeAsO, and LaFeSiH.
- 111-type such as LiFeAs, NaFeAs, and LiFeP.
- 11-type FeSe
- 122-type such as BaFe_{2}As_{2}, SrFe_{2}As_{2} and CaFe_{2}As_{2}

Superconductivity is obtained either in the parent phases of some of these systems (e.g. LaFePO, LaFeSiH, and LiFeAs) or by means of doping or applied pressure.

Undoped β-FeSe is the simplest iron-based superconductor but with distinct properties. It has a critical temperature (T_{c}) of 8 K at normal pressure, and 36.7 K under high pressure and by means of intercalation. The combination of both intercalation and higher pressure results in re-emerging superconductivity at T_{c} of up to 48 K (see, and references therein).

Compared with other families, the synthesis of the 122 compounds is relatively easy which facilitates the investigation of these systems.

Oxypnictide	T_{c} (K)
LaO_{0.89}F_{0.11}FeAs	26
LaO_{0.9}F_{0.2}FeAs	28.5
CeFeAsO_{0.84}F_{0.16}	41
SmFeAsO_{0.9}F_{0.1}	43
La_{0.5}Y_{0.5}FeAsO_{0.6}	43.1
NdFeAsO_{0.89}F_{0.11}	52
PrFeAsO_{0.89}F_{0.11}	52
ErFeAsO_{1−y}	45
Al-32522 (CaAlOFeAs)	30(As), 16.6 (P)
Al-42622 (CaAlOFeAs)	28.3(As), 17.2 (P)
GdFeAsO_{0.85}	53.5
BaFe_{1.8}Co_{0.2}As_{2}	25.3
SmFeAsO_{~0.85}	

Non-oxypnictide	T_{c} (K)
Ba_{0.6}K_{0.4}Fe_{2}As_{2}	38
Ca_{0.6}Na_{0.4}Fe_{2}As_{2}	26
CaFe_{0.9}Co_{0.1}AsF	22
Sr_{0.5}Sm_{0.5}FeAsF	56
LiFeAs	18
NaFeAs	9–25
FeSe	<27
LaFeSiH	11

Compounds such as Sr_{2}ScFePO_{3} discovered in 2009 are referred to as the '42622' family, as FePSr_{2}ScO_{3}. Noteworthy is the synthesis of (Ca_{4}Al_{2}O_{6−y})(Fe_{2}Pn_{2}) (or Al-42622(Pn); Pn = As and P) using high-pressure synthesis technique. Al-42622(Pn) exhibit superconductivity for both Pn = As and P with the transition temperatures of 28.3 K and 17.1 K, respectively. The a-lattice parameters of Al-42622(Pn) (a = 3.713 Å and 3.692 Å for Pn = As and P, respectively) are smallest among the iron-pnictide superconductors. Correspondingly, Al-42622(As) has the smallest As–Fe–As bond angle (102.1°) and the largest As distance from the Fe planes (1.5 Å). High-pressure technique also yields (Ca_{3}Al_{2}O_{5−y})(Fe_{2}Pn_{2}) (Pn = As and P), the first reported iron-based superconductors with the perovskite-based '32522' structure. The transition temperature (T_{c}) is 30.2 K for Pn = As and 16.6 K for Pn = P. The emergence of superconductivity is ascribed to the small tetragonal a-axis lattice constant of these materials. From these results, an empirical relationship was established between the a-axis lattice constant and T_{c} in iron-based superconductors.

In 2009, it was shown that undoped iron pnictides had a magnetic quantum critical point deriving from competition between electronic localization and itinerancy.

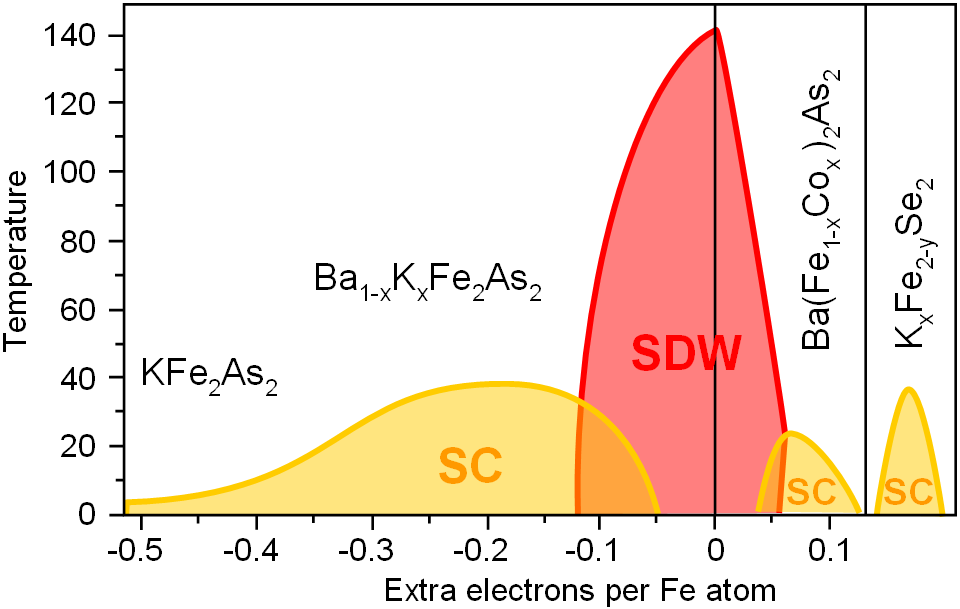
Phase diagram of the 122 family of ferro-pnictides complemented by the 122(Se) family as a generalized phase diagram for the iron based superconductors.

== Properties ==
Similarly to superconducting cuprates, the properties of iron based superconductors change dramatically with doping. Parent compounds of FeSC are usually metals (unlike the cuprates) but, similarly to cuprates, are ordered antiferromagnetically that often termed as a spin-density wave (SDW). Some parent compounds superconduct. Otherwise, superconductivity emerges upon either hole or electron doping. In general, the phase diagram is similar to the cuprates.

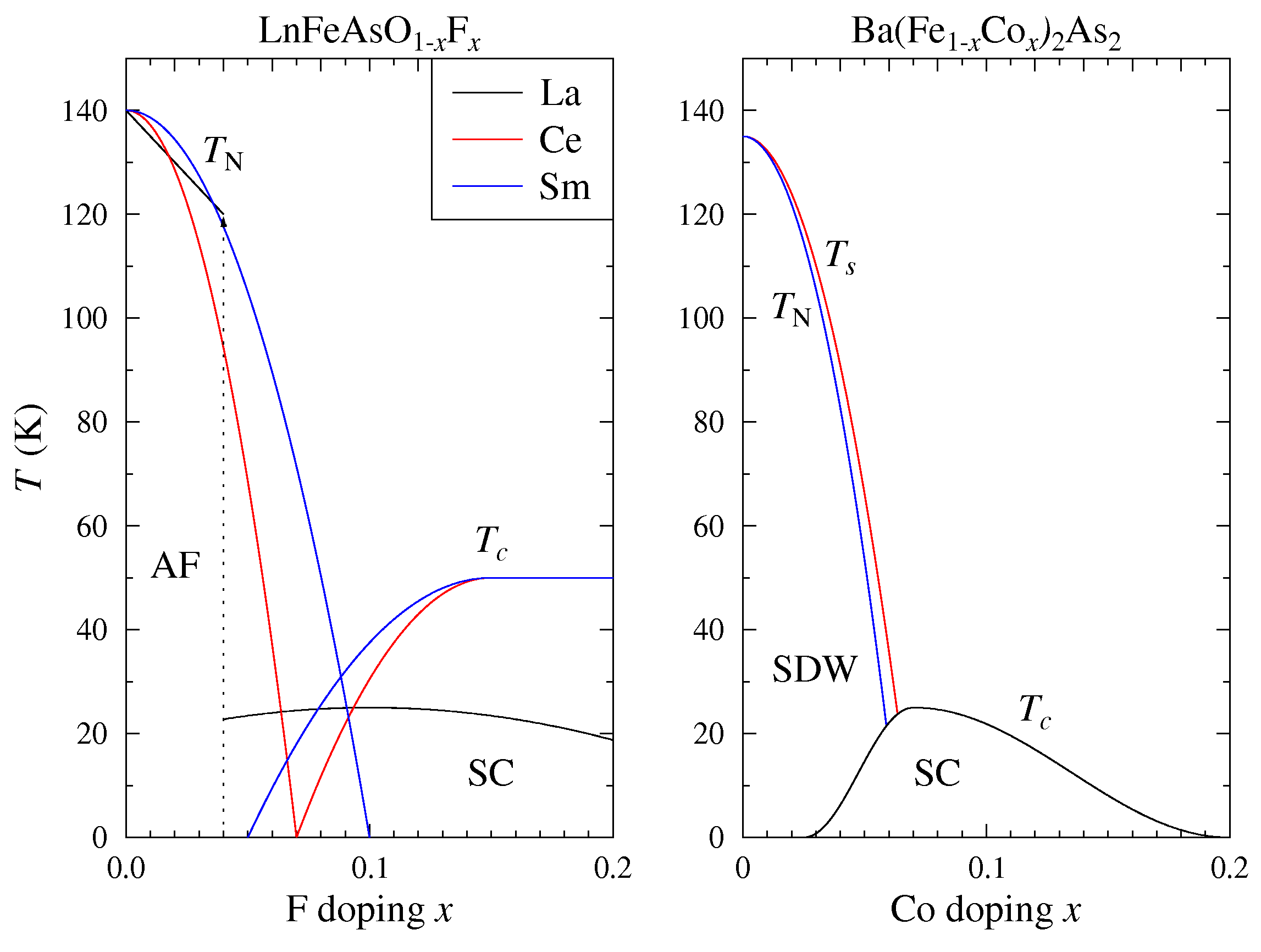
Simplified doping dependent phase diagrams of iron-based superconductors for both Ln-1111 and Ba-122 materials. The phases shown are the antiferromagnetic/spin density wave (AF/SDW) phase close to zero doping and the superconducting phase around optimal doping. The Ln-1111 phase diagrams for La and Sm were determined using muon spin spectroscopy, the phase diagram for Ce was determined using neutron diffraction. The Ba-122 phase diagram is based on.

Superconducting transition temperatures are listed in the tables (some at high pressure). BaFe_{1.8}Co_{0.2}As_{2} is predicted to have an upper critical field of 43 tesla from the measured coherence length of 2.8 nm.

In 2011, Japanese scientists made a discovery which increased a metal compound's superconductivity by immersing iron-based compounds in hot alcoholic beverages such as red wine. Earlier reports indicated that excess Fe is the cause of the bicollinear antiferromagnetic order and is not in favor of superconductivity. Further investigation revealed that weak acid has the ability to deintercalate the excess Fe from the interlayer sites. Therefore, weak acid annealing suppresses the antiferromagnetic correlation by deintercalating the excess Fe and, hence superconductivity is achieved.

There is an empirical correlation of the transition temperature with electronic band structure: the T_{c} maximum is observed when some of the Fermi surface stays in proximity to Lifshitz topological transition. Similar correlation has been later reported for high-T_{c} cuprates that indicates possible similarity of the superconductivity mechanisms in these two families of high temperature superconductors.

=== Thin films ===
The critical temperature is increased further in thin-films of iron chalcogenides on suitable substrates. In 2015, a T_{c} of around 105–111 K was observed in thin films of iron selenide grown on strontium titanate.

== See also ==
- Charge-transfer complex
- Color superconductivity in quarks
- Kondo effect
- Magnetic sail
- National Superconducting Cyclotron Laboratory
- Spallation Neutron Source
- Superconducting radio frequency
- Superfluid film
- Timeline of low-temperature technology
