= 122 iron arsenide =

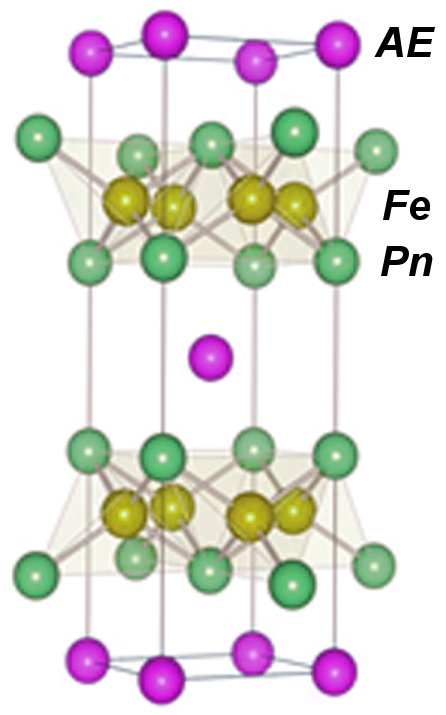
Crystal structure of 122-type AEFe_{2}Pn_{2} superconductors, AE = alkaline earth metal (Ca, Sr, etc.), Pn = pnictide (As, P, etc.)

The 122 iron arsenide unconventional superconductors are part of a new class of iron-based superconductors. They form in the tetragonal I4/mmm, ThCr_{2}Si_{2} type, crystal structure. The shorthand name "122" comes from their stoichiometry; the 122s have the chemical formula AEFe_{2}Pn_{2}, where AE stands for alkaline earth metal (Ca, Ba Sr or Eu) and Pn is pnictide (As, P, etc.). These materials become superconducting under pressure and also upon doping. The maximum superconducting transition temperature found to date is 38 K in the Ba_{0.6}K_{0.4}Fe_{2}As_{2}. The microscopic description of superconductivity in the 122s is yet unclear.

== Overview ==
Ever since the discovery of high-temperature (High T_{c}) superconductivity in the cuprate materials, scientists have worked tirelessly to understand the microscopic mechanisms responsible for its emergence. To this day, no theory can fully explain the high-temperature superconductivity and unconventional (non-s-wave) pairing state found in these materials. However, the interest of the scientific community in understanding the pairing glue for unconventional superconductors—those in which the glue is electronic, i.e. cannot be attributed to the phonon-induced interactions between electrons responsible for conventional BCS theory s-wave superconductivity—has recently been expanded by the discovery of high temperature superconductivity (up to T_{c} = 55 K) in the doped oxypnictide (1111) superconductors with the chemical composition XOFeAs, where X = La, Ce, Pr, Nd, Sm, Gd, Tb, or Dy. The 122s contain the same iron-arsenide planes as the oxypnictides, but are much easier to synthesize in the form of large single crystals.

There are two different ways in which superconductivity was achieved in the 122s. One method is the application of pressure to the undoped parent compounds. The second is the introduction of other elements (dopants) into the crystal structure in very specific ratios. There are two doping schemes: The first type of doping involves the introduction of holes into the barium or strontium varieties; hole doping refers to the substitution of one ion for another with fewer electrons. Superconducting transition temperatures as high as 38 K have been reported upon substitution of the 40% of the Ba^{2+} or Sr^{2+} ions with K^{+}. The second doping method is to directly dope the iron-arsenide layer by replacing iron with cobalt. Superconducting transition temperatures up to ~20 K have been observed in this case.

Unlike the oxypnictides, large single crystals of the 122s can be easily synthesized by using the flux method. The behavior of these materials is interesting by that superconductivity exists alongside antiferromagnetism. Various studies including electrical resistivity, magnetic susceptibility, specific heat, NMR, neutron scattering, X-ray diffraction, Mössbauer spectroscopy, and quantum oscillations have been performed for the undoped parent compounds, as well as the superconducting versions.

== Synthesis ==
One of the important qualities of the 122s is their ease of synthesis; it is possible to grow large single crystals, up to ~5×5×0.5 mm, using the flux method. In a nutshell, the flux method uses some solvent in which the starting materials for a chemical reaction are able to dissolve and eventually crystallize into the desired compound. Two standard methods show up in the literature, each using a different flux. The first method employs tin, while the second uses the binary metallic compound FeAs (iron arsenide).

== Structural and magnetic phase transition ==
The 122s form in the I4/mmm tetragonal structure. For example, the tetragonal unit cell of SrFe_{2}As_{2}, at room temperature, has lattice parameters a = b = 3.9243 Å and c = 12.3644 Å. The planar geometry is reminiscent of the cuprate high-T_{c} superconductors in which the Cu-O layers are believed to support superconductivity.

These materials undergo a first-order structural phase transition into the Fmmm orthorhombic structure below some characteristic temperature T_{0} that is compound specific. NMR experiments on the CaFe_{2}As_{2} show that there is a first-order antiferromagnetic magnetic phase transition at the same temperature; in contrast, the antiferromagnetic transition occurs at a lower temperature in the 1111s. The high temperature magnetic state is paramagnetic, while the low temperature state is an antiferromagnetic state known as a spin-density-wave.

== Superconductivity ==
Superconductivity has been observed in the 122s up to a current maximum T_{c} of 38 K in Ba_{1−x}K_{x}Fe_{2}As_{2} with x ≈ 0.4. Resistivity and magnetic susceptibility measurements have confirmed the bulk nature of the observed superconducting transition. The onset of superconductivity is correlated with the loss of the spin-density-wave state.

The T_{c} of 38 K in Ba_{1−x}K_{x}Fe_{2}As_{2} (x ≈ 0.4) superconductor shows the inverse iron isotope effect.

== Other compounds with 122 structure ==
In addition to the iron arsenides, the 122 crystal structure plays an important role for other material systems as well. Three famous examples from the field of heavy fermions are CeCu_{2}Si_{2} (the "first unconventional superconductor" discovered 1978), URu_{2}Si_{2} (which is also a heavy fermion superconductor but is the focus of active present research due to the so-called "hidden-order phase" below 17.5 K), and YbRh_{2}Si_{2} (one of the prime examples of quantum criticality).
