= Oxypnictide =

Class of materials containing oxygen and a group-V element

In chemistry, oxypnictides are a class of materials composed of oxygen, a pnictogen (group-V, especially phosphorus and arsenic) and one or more other elements. Although this group of compounds has been recognized since 1995, interest in these compounds increased dramatically after the publication of the superconducting properties of LaOFeP and LaOFeAs which were discovered in 2006 and 2008. In these experiments the oxide was partly replaced by fluoride.

These and related compounds (e.g. the 122 iron arsenides) form a new group of iron-based superconductors known as iron pnictides or ferropnictides since the oxygen is not essential but the iron seems to be.

Oxypnictides have been patented as magnetic semiconductors in early 2006.

The different subclasses of oxypnictides are oxynitrides, oxyphosphides, oxyarsenides, oxyantimonides, and oxybismuthides.

== Structure ==
Many of the oxypnictides show a layered structure. For example, LaFePO with layers of La^{3+}O^{2−} and Fe^{2+}P^{3−}. This structure is similar to that of ZrCuSiAs, which is now the parent structure for most of the oxypnictide.

== Superconductivity ==
The first superconducting iron oxypnictide was discovered in 2006, based on phosphorus. A drastic increase in the critical temperature was achieved when phosphorus was substituted by arsenic. This discovery boosted the search for similar compounds, like the search for cuprate-based superconductors after their discovery in 1986.

The superconductivity of the oxypnictides seems to depend on the iron-pnictogen layers.

Some found in 2008 to be high-temperature superconductors (up to 55 K) of composition ReOTmPn, where Re is a rare earth, Tm is a transition metal and Pn is from group V e.g. As.

oxypnictides
Material	T_{c} (K)
LaO_{0.89}F_{0.11}FeAs	26
LaO_{0.9}F_{0.2}FeAs	28.5
CeFeAsO_{0.84}F_{0.16}	41
SmFeAsO_{0.9}F_{0.1}	43
La_{0.5}Y_{0.5}FeAsO_{0.6}	43.1
NdFeAsO_{0.89}F_{0.11}	52
PrFeAsO_{0.89}F_{0.11}	52
GdFeAsO_{0.85}	53.5
SmFeAsO_{~0.85}	55

Tests in magnetic fields up to 45 teslas suggest the upper critical field of LaFeAsO_{0.89}F_{0.11} may be around 64 T. A different lanthanum-based material tested at 6 K predicts an upper critical field of 122 T in La_{0.8}K_{0.2}FeAsO_{0.8}F_{0.2}.

== Practical use ==
Because of the brittleness of the oxypnictides, superconducting wires are formed using the powder-in-tube process (using iron tubes).

== See also ==
- Charge-transfer complex – Association of molecules in which a fraction of electronic charge is transferred between them
- Color superconductivity – Predicted phase in quark matter in quarks
- Kondo effect – Physical phenomenon due to impurities
- Magnetic sail – Proposed spacecraft propulsion method
- National Superconducting Cyclotron Laboratory – Building in Michigan, United States
- Spallation Neutron Source – Accelerator-based neutron source in Oak Ridge, Tennessee, US
- Superconducting radio frequency – Technique used to attain a high quality factor in resonant cavities
- Superfluid film – Thin layer of liquid in a superfluid state
- Timeline of low-temperature technology
