= Susceptor =

Material used to convert electromagnetic energy to heat

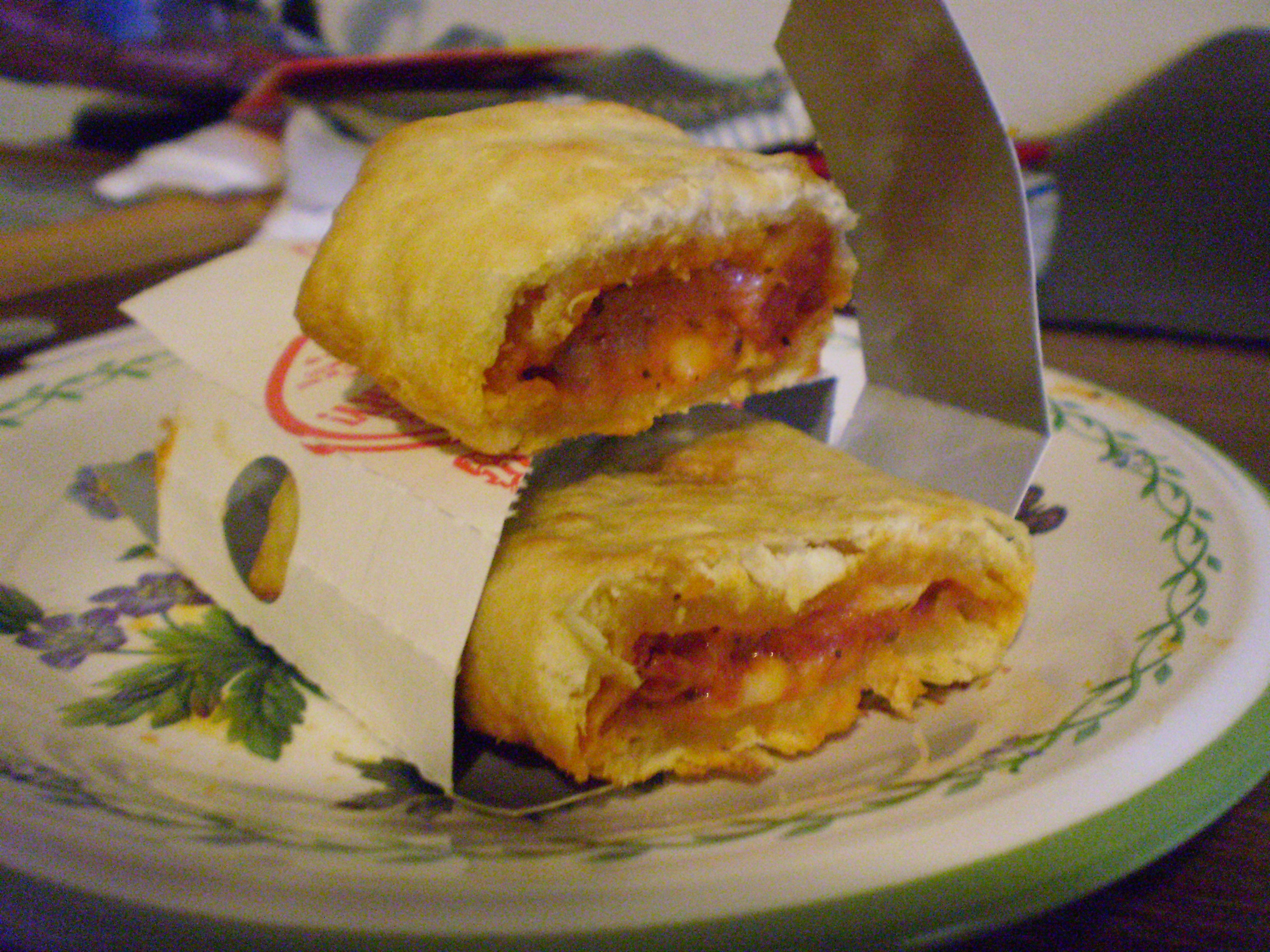
Susceptors may be added to "crisping sleeves" in convenience foods such as Hot Pockets.

A susceptor is a material used for its ability to absorb electromagnetic energy and convert it to heat (which in some cases is re-emitted as infrared thermal radiation). The electromagnetic energy is typically radiofrequency or microwave radiation used in industrial heating processes. In the consumer world, many microwave cooking tools as well as some disposable cooking vessels used with induction heating employ susceptors.

== Operation ==
In microwave cooking, susceptors are built into paper packaging of certain foods, where they absorb microwaves which penetrate the packaging. This process raises the susceptor patch temperature to levels where it may then heat food by conduction or by infrared radiation.

- Conduction heating occurs with good thermal contact between the susceptor and food. Because of the lower temperatures there is less browning, but more than if there were no susceptor at all.
- If there is an air gap or poor thermal contact between the susceptor and food, the susceptor will heat to a much higher temperature due to its smaller effective heat capacity, and will radiate strongly in the infrared. This infrared radiation then shines onto the food below or next to the susceptor, causing a "broiling" effect (high skin heating) due to lower ability of infrared to penetrate foods compared to microwaves. Conversion of some microwave energy to infrared is particularly useful for foods which require a large amount of crust-browning from infrared, such as frozen pies.

== Design and use ==
Susceptors are usually made of metallised film, ceramics or metals (such as aluminium flakes).

Susceptors meant to heat foods by direct conduction may be seen in the gray lining of packaging directly holding the food, and generally in good contact with it. For this reason, products meant to be browned via susceptor-generated thermal radiation carry instructions to microwave the food while still inside its packaging.

A typical example is the paper-susceptor-lined dish directly holding a microwaveable pie, pastie or casserole. This is useful for crisping and browning foods, as well as concentrating heat on the oil in a microwave popcorn bag in order to melt it rapidly.

Among the first microwave susceptors marketed were those from the mid-1980s in a product called McCain Micro Chips by McCain Foods. It consisted of a susceptor sheet which cooked French fries in a microwave oven. These sheets are currently used in several types of packaging for heating and cooking products in microwave ovens. Care in package design and use is required for proper food safety.

A "crisping sleeve" is a device made of paperboard and affixed with a susceptor used both as a rigid container to support the food items within and to focus heat on the foodstuff. They are generally intended for a single use. Hot Pockets were an example of a product which used crisping sleeves; a new formulation that does not need a crisping sleeve was introduced in June 2024.

== Microwave crisper pan ==
Microwave crisper pans and trays convert microwave into infrared to heat food.

== See also ==
- Microwave heat distribution
