= Covalent superconductor =

Superconducting materials where the atoms are linked by covalent bonds

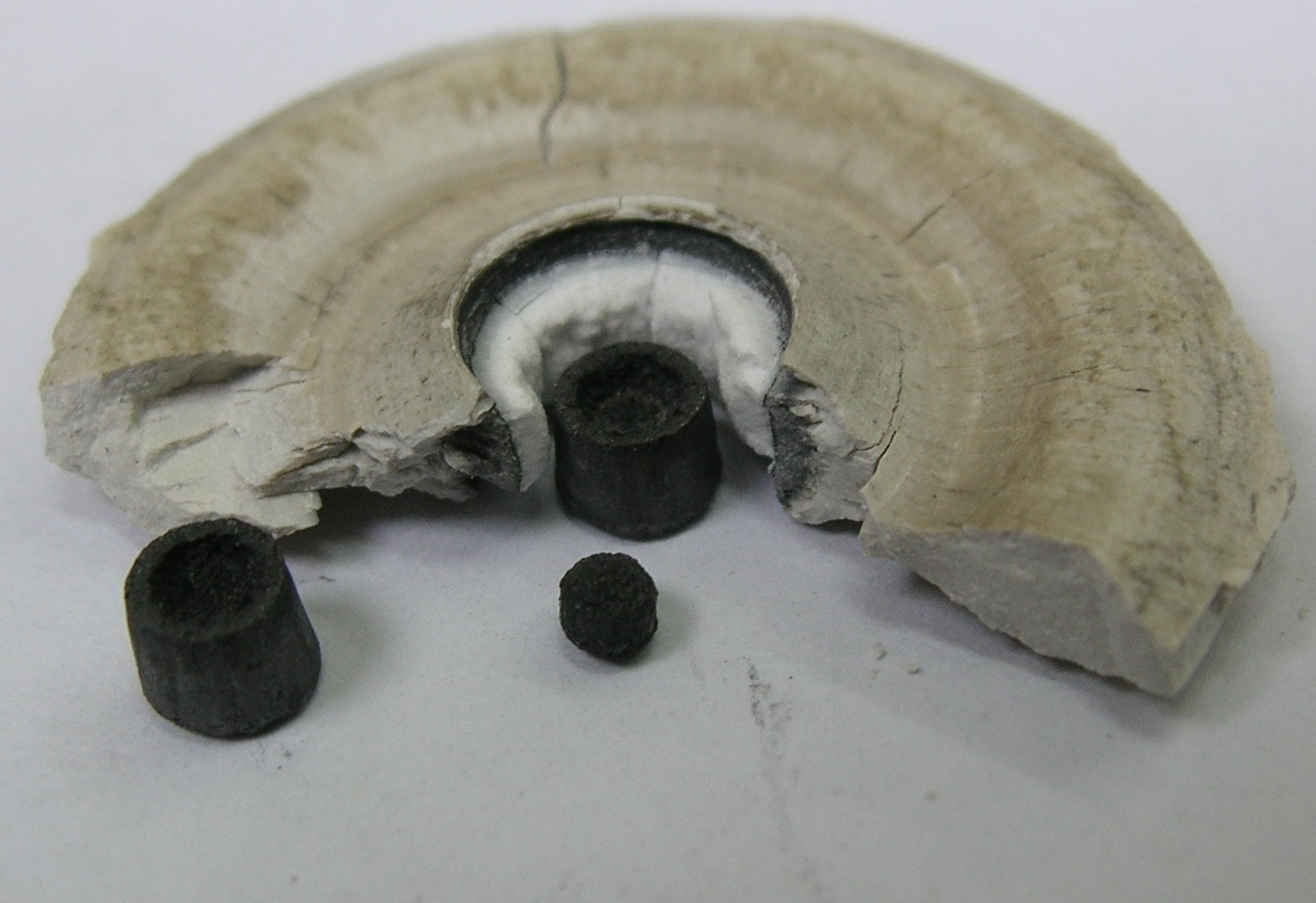
Parts of a high pressure cell after the synthesis of heavily boron doped superconducting diamond. The diamond (black ball) is located between two graphite heaters

Covalent superconductors are superconducting materials where the atoms are linked by covalent bonds. The first such material was boron-doped synthetic diamond grown by the high-pressure high-temperature (HPHT) method. The discovery had no practical importance, but surprised most scientists as superconductivity had not been observed in covalent semiconductors, including diamond and silicon.

== History ==
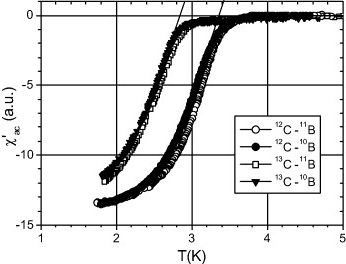
Magnetic AC susceptibility measured as a function of temperature in diamonds enriched with ^{12}C, ^{13}C, ^{10}B or ^{11}B isotopes. The observation and magnitude of the ^{12}C-^{13}C shift confirms the BCS mechanism of superconductivity in bulk polycrystalline boron-doped diamond.

The priority of many discoveries in science is vigorously disputed (see, e.g., Nobel Prize controversies). Another example, after Sumio Iijima has "discovered" carbon nanotubes in 1991, many scientists have pointed out that carbon nanofibers were actually observed decades earlier. The same could be said about superconductivity in covalent semiconductors. Superconductivity in germanium and silicon-germanium was predicted theoretically as early as in the 1960s. Shortly after, superconductivity was experimentally detected in germanium telluride. In 1976, superconductivity with T_{c} = 3.5 K was observed experimentally in germanium implanted with copper ions; it was experimentally demonstrated that amorphization was essential for the superconductivity (in Ge), and the superconductivity was assigned to Ge itself, not copper.

== Diamond ==
Superconductivity in diamond was achieved through heavy p-type doping by boron such that the individual doping atoms started interacting and formed an "impurity band". The superconductivity was of type-II with the critical temperature T_{c} = 4 K and critical magnetic field B_{c} = 4 T. Later, T_{c} ≈ 11 K has been achieved in homoepitaxial CVD films.

Regarding the origin of superconductivity in diamond, three alternative theories were suggested: conventional BCS theory based on phonon-mediated pairing, correlated impurity band theory and spin-flip-driven pairing of holes weakly localized in the vicinity of the Fermi level. Experiments on diamonds enriched with ^{12}C, ^{13}C, ^{10}B or ^{11}B isotopes revealed a clear T_{c} shift, and its magnitude confirms the BCS mechanism of superconductivity in bulk polycrystalline diamond.

== Carbon nanotubes ==
While there have been reports of intrinsic superconductivity in carbon nanotubes, many other experiments found no evidence of superconductivity, and the validity of these results remains a subject of debate. Note, however, a crucial difference between nanotubes and diamond: Although nanotubes contain covalently bonded carbon atoms, they are closer in properties to graphite than diamond, and can be metallic without doping. Meanwhile, undoped diamond is an insulator.

== Intercalated graphite ==
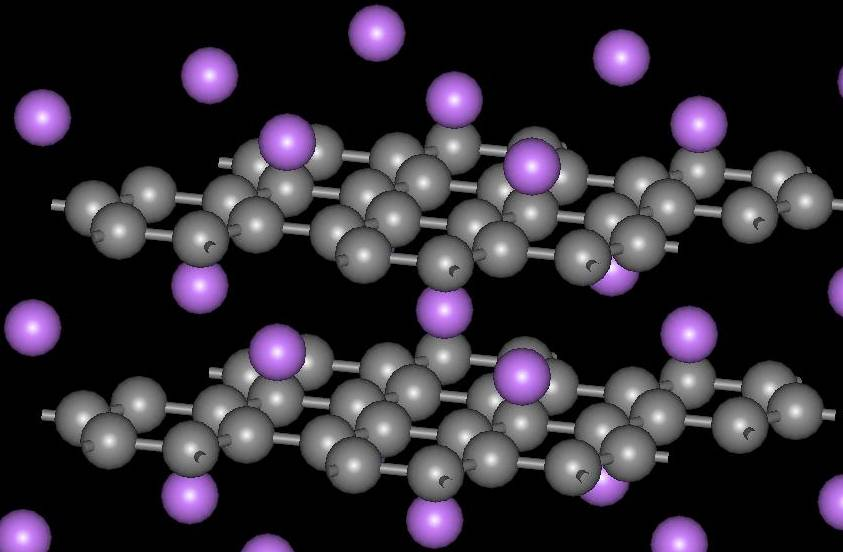
Structure of CaC_{6}

When metal atoms are inserted (intercalated) between the graphite planes, several superconductors are created with the following transition temperatures:

Material	CaC_{6}	Li_{3}Ca_{2}C_{6}	YbC_{6}	SrC_{6}	KC_{8}	RbC_{8}	NaC_{3}	KC_{3}	LiC_{3}	NaC_{2}	LiC_{2}
T_{c} (K)	11.5	11.15	6.5	1.65	0.14	0.025	2.3–3.8	3.0	<0.35	5.0	1.9

== Silicon ==
It was suggested that "Si and Ge, which also form in the diamond structure, may similarly exhibit superconductivity under the appropriate conditions", and indeed, discoveries of superconductivity in heavily boron doped Si (Si:B) and SiC:B have quickly followed. Similar to diamond, Si:B is type-II superconductor, but it has much smaller values of T_{c} = 0.4 K and B_{c} = 0.4 T. Superconductivity in Si:B was achieved by heavy doping (above 8 at.%), realized through a special non-equilibrium technique of gas immersion laser doping.

== Silicon carbide ==
Superconductivity in SiC was achieved by heavy doping with boron or aluminum. Both the cubic (3C-SiC) and hexagonal (6H-SiC) phases are superconducting and show a very similar T_{c} of 1.5 K. A crucial difference is however observed for the magnetic field behavior between aluminum and boron doping: SiC:Al is type-II, same as Si:B. On the contrary, SiC:B is type-I. In attempt to explain this difference, it was noted that Si sites are more important than carbon sites for superconductivity in SiC. Whereas boron substitutes carbon in SiC, Al substitutes Si sites. Therefore, Al and B "see" different environment that might explain different properties of SiC:Al and SiC:B.

== Hydrogen sulfide ==
At pressures above 90 GPa (gigapascal), hydrogen sulfide becomes a metallic conductor of electricity. When cooled below a critical temperature its high-pressure phase exhibits superconductivity. The critical temperature increases with pressure, ranging from 23 K at 100 GPa to 150 K at 200 GPa. If hydrogen sulfide is pressurized at higher temperatures, then cooled, the critical temperature reaches 203 K (−70 °C), the highest accepted superconducting critical temperature as of 2015. By substituting a small part of sulfur with phosphorus and using even higher pressures, it has been predicted that it may be possible to raise the critical temperature to above 0 °C (273 K) and achieve room-temperature superconductivity.

== See also ==
- Silicon
- Silicon carbide – Wide-bandgap semiconductor and abrasion-resistant ceramic
- Synthetic diamond – Diamond created by controlled processes
- Timeline of low-temperature technology
