= Conventional superconductor =

Materials that display superconductivity as described by BCS theory or its extensions

Conventional superconductors are materials that display superconductivity as described by BCS theory or its extensions. This is in contrast to unconventional superconductors, which do not. Conventional superconductors can be either type-I or type-II.

Most elemental superconductors are conventional. Niobium and vanadium are type-II, while most other elemental superconductors are type-I. Critical temperatures of some elemental superconductors:

Element	T_{c} (K)
Al	1.20
Hg	4.15
Mo	0.92
Nb	9.26
Pb	7.19
Sn	3.72
Ta	4.48
Ti	0.39
V	5.30
Zn	0.88

Most compound and alloy superconductors are type-II materials. The most commonly used conventional superconductor in applications is a niobium-titanium alloy - this is a type-II superconductor with a superconducting critical temperature of 11 K. The highest critical temperature so far achieved in a conventional superconductor was 39 K (-234 °C) in magnesium diboride.

== BKBO ==
Ba_{0.6}K_{0.4}BiO_{3} is an unusual superconductor (a non-cuprate oxide) - but considered 'conventional' in the sense that the BCS theory applies.

== See also ==
- Matthias rules
