= Gas immersion laser doping =

Gas immersion laser doping (GILD) is a method of doping a semiconductor material such as silicon.

In the case of doping silicon with boron to create a P-type semiconductor material, a thin wafer of silicon is placed in a containment chamber and is immersed in boron gas. A pulsed laser is directed at the silicon wafer and this results in localised melting and subsequent recrystallisation of the silicon wafer material, allowing boron atoms in the gas to diffuse into the molten sections of the silicon wafer. The result of this process is a silicon wafer with boron impurities, creating a P-type semiconductor.
