= Magnesium diboride =

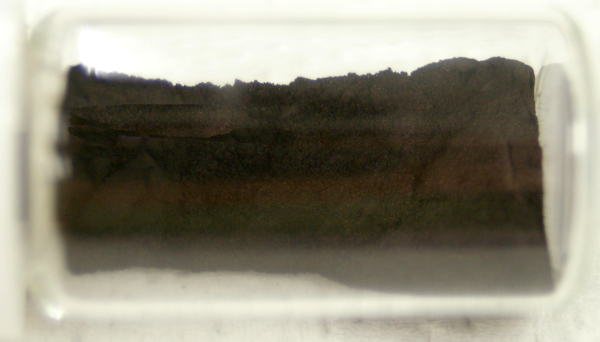
- Ball-and-stick model of the part of the crystal structure of magnesium diboride

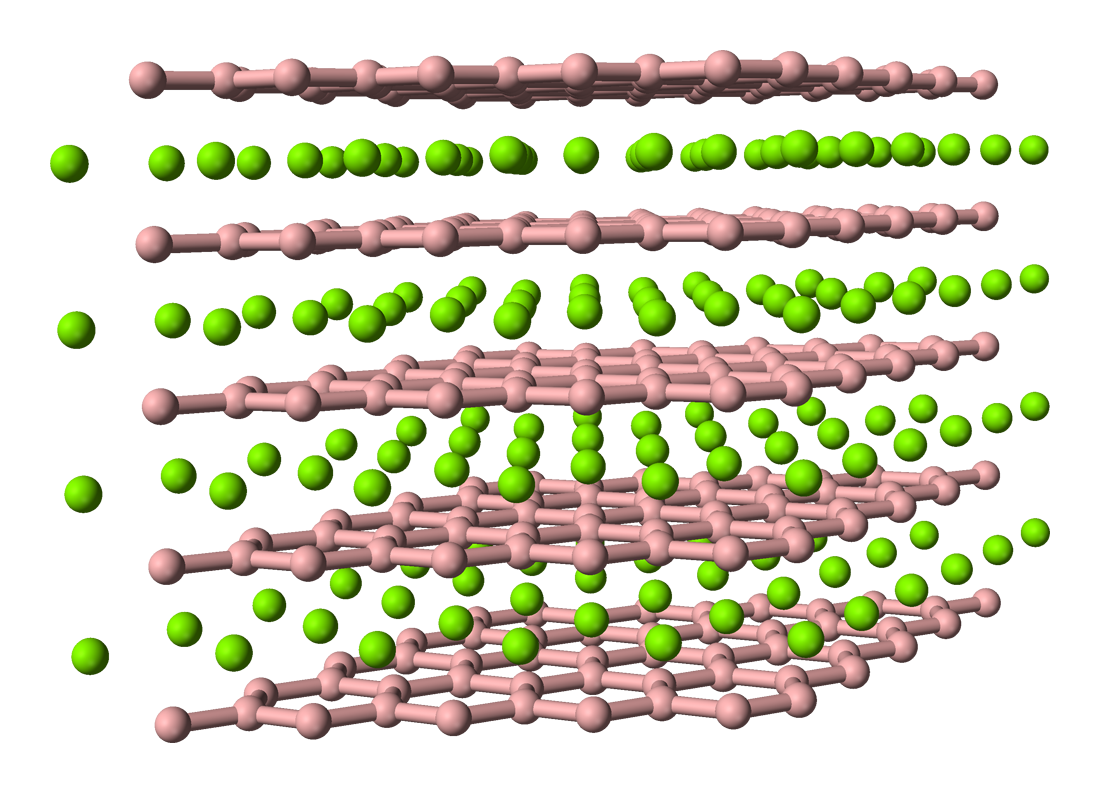

Identifiers
CAS Number	12007-25-9
3D model (JSmol)	Interactive image; Interactive image
ChemSpider	13118398
ECHA InfoCard	100.031.352
EC Number	234-501-2
PubChem CID	15987061
CompTox Dashboard (EPA)	DTXSID60893677
- InChI: InChI=1S/2B.Mg Key: PZKRHHZKOQZHIO-UHFFFAOYSA-N
- SMILES: [B-]=[B-].[Mg+2]; [Mg+2].[Mg+2].[Mg+2].[Mg+2].[Mg+2].[Mg+2].[B-]1=[B-][B-]2=[B-][B-]=[B-]3[B-]=[B-][B-]4=[B-][B-]=[B-]5[B-]=[B-][B-]6=[B-][B-]=[B-]1[B-]7=[B-]2[B-]3=[B-]4[B-]5=[B-]67.[Mg+2].[Mg+2].[Mg+2].[Mg+2].[Mg+2].[Mg+2]

Properties
Chemical formula	MgB_{2}
Molar mass	45.93 g/mol
Density	2.57 g/cm^{3}
Melting point	830 °C (1,530 °F; 1,100 K) (decomposes)

Structure
Crystal structure	Hexagonal, hP3
Space group	P6/mmm, No. 191
- Except where otherwise noted, data are given for materials in their standard state (at 25 °C [77 °F], 100 kPa). verify (what is ?) Infobox references

Magnesium diboride is the inorganic compound of magnesium and boron with the formula MgB_{2}. It is a dark gray, water-insoluble solid. The compound becomes superconducting at 39 K (−234 °C), which has attracted attention. In terms of its composition, MgB_{2} differs strikingly from most low-temperature superconductors, which feature mainly transition metals. Its superconducting mechanism is primarily described by BCS theory.

== Superconductivity ==
Magnesium diboride's superconducting properties were discovered in 2001. Its critical temperature (T_{c}) of 39 K (−234 °C; −389 °F) is the highest amongst conventional superconductors. Among conventional (phonon-mediated) superconductors, it is unusual. Its electronic structure is such that there exist two types of electrons at the Fermi level with widely differing behaviours, one of them (sigma-bonding) being much more strongly superconducting than the other (pi-bonding). This is at odds with usual theories of phonon-mediated superconductivity which assume that all electrons behave in the same manner. Theoretical understanding of the properties of MgB_{2} has nearly been achieved by modelling two energy gaps. In 2001 it was regarded as behaving more like a metallic than a cuprate superconductor.

=== Semi-Meissner state ===
Using BCS theory and the known energy gaps of the pi and sigma bands of electrons (2.2 and 7.1 meV, respectively), the pi and sigma bands of electrons have been found to have two different coherence lengths (51 nm and 13 nm, respectively). The corresponding London penetration depths are 33.6 nm and 47.8 nm. This implies that the Ginzburg-Landau parameters are 0.66±0.02 and 3.68, respectively. The first is less than 1/√2 and the second is greater, therefore the first seems to indicate marginal type I superconductivity and the second type II superconductivity.

It has been predicted that when two different bands of electrons yield two quasiparticles, one of which has a coherence length that would indicate type I superconductivity and one of which would indicate type II, then in certain cases, vortices attract at long distances and repel at short distances. In particular, the potential energy between vortices is minimized at a critical distance. As a consequence there is a conjectured new phase called the semi-Meissner state, in which vortices are separated by the critical distance. When the applied flux is too small for the entire superconductor to be filled with a lattice of vortices separated by the critical distance, then there are large regions of type I superconductivity, a Meissner state, separating these domains.

Experimental confirmation for this conjecture has arrived recently in MgB_{2} experiments at 4.2 Kelvin. The authors found that there are indeed regimes with a much greater density of vortices. Whereas the typical variation in the spacing between Abrikosov vortices in a type II superconductor is of order 1%, they found a variation of order 50%, in line with the idea that vortices assemble into domains where they may be separated by the critical distance. The term type-1.5 superconductivity was coined for this state.

== Synthesis ==
Magnesium diboride was synthesized and its structure confirmed in 1953. The simplest synthesis involves high temperature reaction between boron and magnesium powders. Formation begins at 650 °C; however, since magnesium metal melts at 652 °C, the reaction may involve diffusion of magnesium vapor across boron grain boundaries. At conventional reaction temperatures, sintering is minimal, although grain recrystallization is sufficient for Josephson quantum tunnelling between grains.

Superconducting magnesium diboride wire can be produced through the powder-in-tube (PIT) ex situ and in situ processes. In the in situ variant, a mixture of boron and magnesium is reduced in diameter by conventional wire drawing. The wire is then heated to the reaction temperature to form MgB_{2}. In the ex situ variant, the tube is filled with MgB_{2} powder, reduced in diameter, and sintered at 800 to 1000 °C. In both cases, later hot isostatic pressing at approximately 950 °C further improves the properties.

An alternative technique, disclosed in 2003, employs reactive liquid infiltration of magnesium inside a granular preform of boron powders and was called Mg-RLI technique. The method allowed the manufacture of both high density (more than 90% of the theoretical density for MgB_{2}) bulk materials and special hollow fibers. This method is equivalent to similar melt growth based methods such as the Infiltration and Growth Processing method used to fabricate bulk YBCO superconductors where the non-superconducting Y_{2}BaCuO_{5} is used as granular preform inside which YBCO based liquid phases are infiltrated to make superconductive YBCO bulk. This method has been copied and adapted for MgB_{2} and rebranded as Reactive Mg Liquid Infiltration. The process of Reactive Mg Liquid Infiltration in a boron preform to obtain MgB_{2} has been a subject of patent applications by the Italian company Edison S.p.A.

Hybrid physical–chemical vapor deposition (HPCVD) has been the most effective technique for depositing magnesium diboride (MgB_{2}) thin films. The surfaces of MgB_{2} films deposited by other technologies are usually rough and non-stoichiometric. In contrast, the HPCVD system can grow high-quality in situ pure MgB_{2} films with smooth surfaces, which are required to make reproducible uniform Josephson junctions, the fundamental element of superconducting circuits.

== Electromagnetic properties ==
Properties depend greatly on composition and fabrication process. Many properties are anisotropic due to the layered structure. 'Dirty' samples, e.g., with oxides at the crystal boundaries, are different from 'clean' samples.

- The highest superconducting transition temperature T_{c} is 39 K.
- MgB_{2} is a type-II superconductor, i.e. increasing magnetic field gradually penetrates into it.
- Maximum critical current (J_{c}) is: 10^{5} A/m^{2} at 20 T, 10^{6} A/m^{2} at 18 T, 10^{7} A/m^{2} at 15 T, 10^{8} A/m^{2} at 10 T, 10^{9} A/m^{2} at 5 T.
- As of 2008 : Upper critical field (H_{c2}): (parallel to ab planes) is ~14 T, (perpendicular to ab planes) ~3 T, in thin films up to 74 T, in fibers up to 55 T.

=== Improvement by doping ===
Various means of doping MgB_{2} with carbon (e.g. using 10% malic acid) can improve the upper critical field and the maximum current density (also with polyvinyl acetate).

5% doping with carbon can raise H_{c2} from 16 to 36 T while lowering T_{c} only from 39 K to 34 K. The maximum critical current (J_{c}) is reduced, but doping with TiB_{2} can reduce the decrease. (Doping MgB_{2} with Ti is patented.)

The maximum critical current (J_{c}) in magnetic field is enhanced greatly (approx double at 4.2 K) by doping with ZrB_{2}.

Even small amounts of doping lead both bands into the type II regime and so no semi-Meissner state may be expected.

== Thermal conductivity ==
MgB_{2} is a multi-band superconductor, that is each Fermi surface has different superconducting energy gap. For MgB_{2}, sigma bond of boron is strong, and it induces large s-wave superconducting gap, and pi bond is weak and induces small s-wave gap. The quasiparticle states of the vortices of large gap are highly confined to the vortex core. On the other hand, the quasiparticle states of small gap are loosely bound to the vortex core. Thus they can be delocalized and overlap easily between adjacent vortices. Such delocalization can strongly contribute to the thermal conductivity, which shows abrupt increase above H_{c1}.

== Possible applications ==
=== Superconductors ===
Superconducting properties and low cost make magnesium diboride attractive for a variety of applications. For those applications, MgB_{2} powder is compressed with silver metal (or 316 stainless steel) into wire and sometimes tape via the Powder-in-tube process.

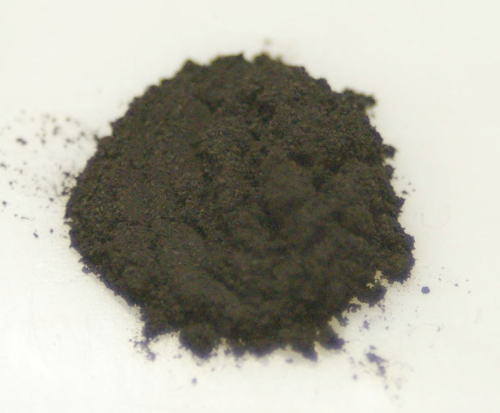

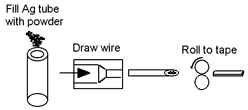

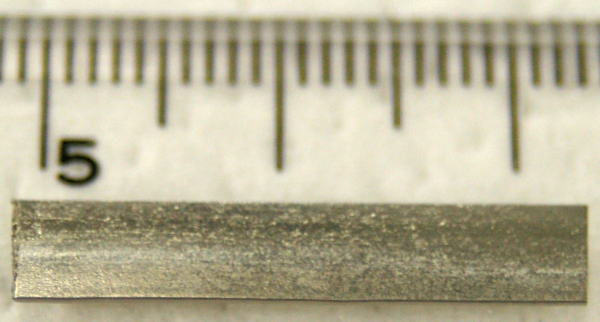

In 2006 a 0.5 tesla open MRI superconducting magnet system was built using 18 km of MgB_{2} wires. This MRI used a closed-loop cryocooler, without requiring externally supplied cryogenic liquids for cooling.

"...the next generation MRI instruments must be made of MgB_{2} coils instead of NbTi coils, operating in the 20–25 K range without liquid helium for cooling. ... Besides the magnet applications MgB_{2} conductors have potential uses in superconducting transformers, rotors and transmission cables at temperatures of around 25 K, at fields of 1 T."

A project at CERN to make MgB_{2} cables has resulted in superconducting test cables able to carry 20,000 amperes for extremely high current distribution applications, such as the high luminosity upgrade of the Large Hadron Collider.

The IGNITOR tokamak design was based on MgB_{2} for its poloidal coils.

Thin coatings can be used in superconducting radio frequency cavities to minimize energy loss and reduce the inefficiency of liquid helium cooled niobium cavities.

Because of the low cost of its constituent elements, MgB_{2} has promise for use in superconducting low to medium field magnets, electric motors and generators, fault current limiters and current leads.

=== Propellants, explosives, pyrotechnics ===
Unlike elemental boron whose combustion is incomplete, due to the formation of a glassy oxide layered impeding oxygen diffusion, magnesium diboride burns completely when ignited in oxygen or in mixtures with oxidizers. Thus magnesium boride has been proposed as fuel in ram jets. In addition, the use of MgB_{2} in blast-enhanced explosives and propellants has been proposed for the same reasons. Decoy flares containing magnesium diboride/Teflon/Viton display 30–60% increased spectral efficiency, E_{λ} (J g^{−1}sr^{−1}), compared to classical Magnesium/Teflon/Viton(MTV) payloads. An application of magnesium diboride to hybrid rocket propulsion has also been investigated, mixing the compound in paraffin wax fuel grains to improve mechanical properties and combustion characteristics.
