= Oxybismuthides =

Class of chemical compounds

Oxybismuthides or bismuthide oxides are chemical compounds formally containing the group BiO, with one bismuth and one oxygen atom. The bismuth and oxygen are not bound together as in bismuthates, instead they make a separate presence bound to the cations (metals), and could be considered as a mixed bismuthide-oxide compound. So a compound with O_{m}Bi_{n} requires cations to balance a negative charge of 2m+3n. The cations will have charges of +2 or +3. The trications are often rare earth elements or actinides. They are in the category of oxypnictide compounds.

Many of the bismuthide oxides have bismuth in an unusual −2 oxidation state. The ones with Ln_{2}BiO_{2} have the anti-ThCr_{2}Si_{2} structure. They include alternating layers of LnO (anti-fluorite-type) and LnBiO. The Eu_{4}Bi_{2}O has an anti-K_{2}NiF_{4} structure, the same as for Na_{2}Ti_{2}As_{2}O. Some other compounds contain calcium and a rare earth CaRE_{3}BiO_{4}, and Ca_{2}RE_{8}Bi_{3}O_{10}.

Some of these compounds are superconductors at very low temperatures and many are semiconductors at standard conditions.

== Examples ==
formula	name	mw	structure	space group	cell	appearance	properties	supercondicting T_{c}	reference
Ti_{8}BiO_{7}	octatitanium bismuthide heptoxide		orthorhombic	Cmmm	I = 7.8473 Å, b = 16.829 Å, c = 3.0256 Å	silver	conductor		
(SrF)_{2}Ti_{2}Bi_{2}O			tetragonal	I4/mmm					
BaTi_{2}Bi_{2}O			tetragonal		a = 4.046 Å, c = 7.272 Å				
LaNiBiO	Lanthanum nickel oxybismuthide							4.2	
Ce_{2}O_{2}Bi			tetragonal	I4/mmm	a=4.034 c=13.736				
Nd_{2}BiO_{2}		529.46	tetragonal	I4/mmm	a=399.11 c = 1366.3 V=217.53	dark grey			
Tb_{2}BiO_{2}		558.82	tetragonal	I4/mmm	a=389.62 c=1331.7 V=202.16	dark grey			
Dy_{2}BiO_{2}		565.98	tetragonal	I4/mmm	a=387.61 c=1323.3 V=198.82	dark grey			
Ho_{2}BiO_{2}		570.84	tetragonal	I4/mmm	a=385.83 c=1321.8 V=196.77	dark grey			
La_{2}BiO_{2}			tetragonal	I4/mmm	a=4.08083 c=13.9866 V=198.74				
Er_{2}BiO_{2}			tetragonal	I4/mmm	a=3.84531 c=13.1513 V=194.48				
(EuF)_{2}Ti_{2}Bi_{2}O			tetragonal	I4/mmm	a=4.1172 c=21.2718				
Gd_{2}BiO_{2}			tetragonal	I4/mmm	a=3.9181 c=13.4246 V=206.09				
Y_{2}BiO_{2}			tetragonal	I4/mmm	a=3.8734 c=13.2469 V=198.74				
Pr_{2}BiO_{2}			tetragonal	I4/mmm					
Nd_{2}BiO_{2}			tetragonal	I4/mmm	a=3.99258 c=13.6663 V=217.851				
Ho_{2}BiO_{2}			tetragonal	I4/mmm	a=3.86212 c=13.2262 V=197.28				
Sm_{2}BiO_{2}			tetragonal	I4/mmm	a=3.95296 c=13.5083 V=211.074				
Sm_{4}Bi_{2}O									
Eu_{4}Bi_{2}O									
Ba_{2}Cd2.13Bi_{3}O	Dibarium tricadmium bismuthide(-I,-III) oxide		tetragonal	I4/mmm	a = 4.7396 c = 43.601 V=979.5 Z=4	black			
Gd_{3}BiO_{3}			monoclinic	C2/m					
Gd_{8}Bi_{3}O_{8}			monoclinic	C2/m		grey			
Ca_{2}RE_{7}Bi_{5}O_{5}						grey			
Cm_{2}BiO_{2}			tetragonal	I4/mmmm	a=3.957 c=13.359				
Am_{2}BiO_{2}	Americium dioxybismuthide		orthorhombic	Pnam	a=5.053 b=8.092 c=5.738				
