= Fulleride =

Chemical compound

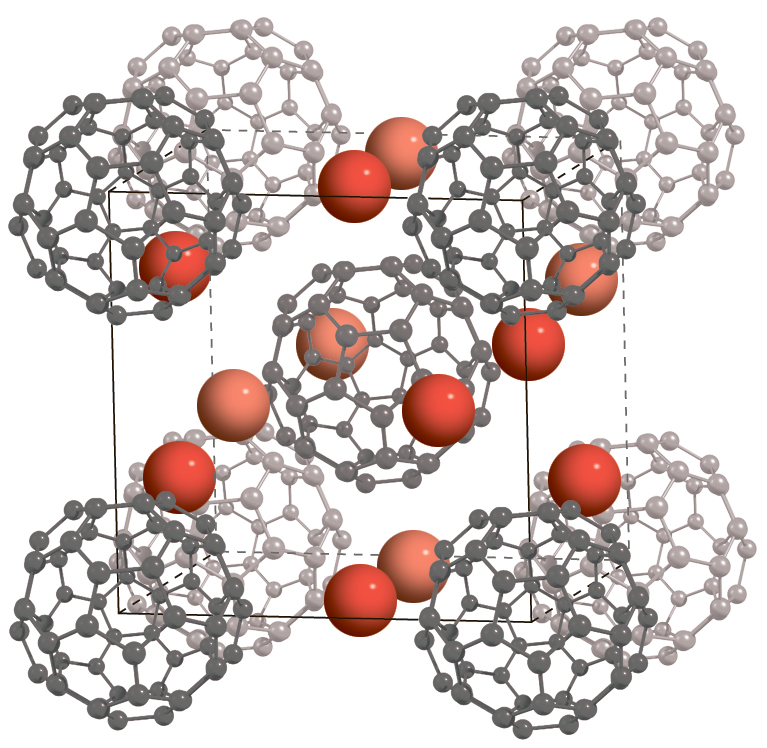
Cs_{3}C_{60} crystal structure

Fullerides are chemical compounds containing fullerene anions. Common fullerides are derivatives of the most common fullerenes, i.e. C_{60} and C_{70}. The scope of the area is large because multiple charges are possible, i.e., [C_{60}]^{n−} (n = 1, 2...6), and all fullerenes can be converted to fullerides. The suffix "-ide" implies their negatively charged nature.

Fullerides can be isolated as derivatives with a wide range of cations. Most heavily studied derivatives are those with alkali metals, but fullerides have been prepared with organic cations. Fullerides are typically dark colored solids that generally dissolve in polar organic solvents.

== Structure and bonding ==
According to electronic structure calculations, the LUMO of C_{60} is a triply degenerate orbital of t_{1u} symmetry. Using the technique cyclic voltammetry, C_{60} can be shown to undergo six reversible reductions starting at −1 V referenced to the Fc^{+}/Fc couple. Reduction causes only subtle changes in the structure and many derivatives exhibit disorder, which obscures these effects. Many fullerides are subject to Jahn–Teller distortion. In certain cases, e.g. [PPN]_{2}C_{60}, the structures are highly ordered and slight (10 pm) elongation of some C−C bonds is observed.

== Preparation ==
Fullerides have been prepared in various ways:

- treating with alkali metals to give the alkali metal fullerides:

C_{60} + 2 K → K_{2}C_{60}

- treating with suitable organic and organometallic reducing agents, such as cobaltocene and tetrakisdimethylaminoethylene.
- alkali metal fullerides can be subjected to cation metathesis. In this way the (bis(triphenylphosphine)iminium (PPN^{+}) salts have been prepared, e.g. [PPN]_{2}C_{60}:

K_{2}C_{60} + 2 [PPN]Cl → [PPN]_{2}C_{60} + 2 KCl

The fulleride salt ([K(crypt-222)]^{+})_{2}[C_{60}]^{2−} salt is synthesized by treating C_{60} with metallic potassium in the presence of [2.2.2]cryptand.

== Alkali metal derivatives ==
Critical temperatures (T_{c}) of the fulleride salts
M_{3}C_{60}	T_{c} (K)
Na_{3}C_{60}	(non-superconducting)
K_{3}C_{60}	18
Rb_{3}C_{60}	28
Cs_{3}C_{60}	40

Particular attention has been paid to alkali metal (Na^{+}, K^{+}, Rb^{+}, Cs^{+}) derivatives of C_{60}^{3−} because these compounds exhibit physical properties resulting from intercluster interactions such as metallic behavior. In contrast, in C_{60}, the individual molecules interact only weakly, i.e. with essentially nonoverlapping bands. These alkali metal derivatives are sometimes viewed as arising by intercalation of the metal into C_{60} lattice. Alternatively, these materials are viewed as n-doped fullerenes.

Alkali metal salts of this trianion are superconducting. In M_{3}C_{60} (M = Na, K, Rb), the M^{+} ions occupy the interstitial holes in a lattice composed of ccp lattice composed of nearly spherical C_{60} anions. In Cs_{3}C_{60}, the cages are arranged in a bcc lattice.

In 1991, it was revealed that potassium-doped C_{60} becomes superconducting at 18 K (−255 °C). This was the highest transition temperature for a molecular superconductor. Since then, superconductivity has been reported in fullerene doped with various other alkali metals. It has been shown that the superconducting transition temperature in alkaline-metal-doped fullerene increases with the unit-cell volume V. As Cs^{+} is the largest alkali ion, caesium-doped fullerene is an important material in this family. Superconductivity at 38 K (−235 °C) has been reported in bulk Cs_{3}C_{60}, but only under applied pressure. The highest superconducting transition temperature of 33 K (−240 °C) at ambient pressure is reported for Cs_{2}RbC_{60}.

The increase of transition temperature with the unit-cell volume had been believed to be evidence for the BCS mechanism of C_{60} solid superconductivity, because inter C_{60} separation can be related to an increase in the density of states on the Fermi level, N(ε_{F}). Therefore, efforts have been made to increase the interfullerene separation, in particular, intercalating neutral molecules into the A_{3}C_{60} lattice to increase the interfullerene spacing while the valence of C_{60} is kept unchanged. However, this ammoniation technique has revealed a new aspect of fullerene intercalation compounds: the Mott transition and the correlation between the orientation/orbital order of C_{60} molecules and the magnetic structure.

Fourfold-reduced materials, i.e., those with the stoichiometry A_{4}C_{60}, are insulating, even though the t_{1u} band is only partially filled. This apparent anomaly may be explained by the Jahn–Teller effect, where spontaneous deformations of high-symmetry molecules induce the splitting of degenerate levels to gain the electronic energy. The Jahn–Teller type electron-phonon interaction is strong enough in C_{60} solids to destroy the band picture for particular valence states.

A narrow band or strongly correlated electronic system and degenerated ground states are relevant to explaining superconductivity in fulleride solids. When the interelectron repulsion U is greater than the bandwidth, an insulating localized electron ground state is produced in the simple Mott–Hubbard model. This explains the absence of superconductivity at ambient pressure in caesium-doped C_{60} solids. Electron-correlation-driven localization of the t_{1u} electrons exceeds the critical value, leading to the Mott insulator. The application of high pressure decreases the interfullerene spacing, therefore caesium-doped C_{60} solids turn to metallic and superconducting.

A fully developed theory of C_{60} solids superconductivity is lacking, but it has been widely accepted that strong electronic correlations and the Jahn–Teller electron–phonon coupling produce local electron pairings that show a high transition temperature close to the insulator–metal transition.
