= Critical field =

Limiting magnetic field strength for superconductivity

For a given temperature, the critical field refers to the maximum magnetic field strength below which a material remains superconducting. Superconductivity is characterized both by perfect conductivity (zero resistance) and by the complete expulsion of magnetic fields (the Meissner effect). Changes in either temperature or magnetic flux density can cause the phase transition between normal and superconducting states. The highest temperature under which the superconducting state is seen is known as the critical temperature. At that temperature even the weakest external magnetic field will destroy the superconducting state, so the strength of the critical field is zero. As temperature decreases, the critical field increases to a maximum at absolute zero. In type-II superconductors, there are two critical fields; at the first one, magnetic vortices penetrate the superconductor, and superconductivity is destroyed above the second one.

== Introduction ==
It is found empirically that the critical field in a superconductor is dependent on the temperature through the relation

$$H_c(T)=H_c(0)\left(1-\left(\frac{T}{T_c}\right)^2\right),$$

where $H_c$ is the critical magnetic field, $T$ is the temperature, and $T_c$ is the critical temperature of the superconducting material.

For a type-I superconductor the discontinuity in heat capacity ($C_{sc}-C_{nc}$) seen at the superconducting transition is generally related to the slope of the critical field at the critical temperature: (in Gaussian units)

$$C_\text{sc} - C_\text{nc} = {T \over 4 \pi} \left(\frac{dH_\text{c}}{dT}\right)^2_{T=T_\text{c}}.$$

The geometry of the superconducting sample complicates the practical measurement of the critical field – the critical field is defined for a cylindrical sample with the field parallel to the axis of radial symmetry. With other shapes (spherical, for example), there may be a mixed state with partial penetration of the exterior surface by the magnetic field (and thus partial normal state), while the interior of the sample remains superconducting.

== Critical current ==
There is a direct relation between the critical field and the critical current – the maximum electric current density that a given superconducting material can carry, before switching into the normal state. According to Ampère's law any electric current induces a magnetic field, but superconductors exclude that field. On a microscopic scale, the magnetic field is not quite zero at the edges of any given sample – a penetration depth applies. For a type-I superconductor, the current must remain zero within the bulk of the superconducting material (to be compatible with zero magnetic field), but can go to non-zero values at the edges of the material on this penetration-depth length-scale, as the magnetic field rises. As long as the induced magnetic field at the edges is less than the critical field, the material remains superconducting, but at higher currents, the field becomes too strong and the superconducting state is lost. This limit on current density has important practical implications in applications of superconducting materials – despite zero resistance they cannot carry unlimited quantities of electric power.

== Type-II superconductors ==
Type-II superconductors allow a different sort of mixed state, where the magnetic field (above the lower critical field $H_{c1}$) is allowed to penetrate along cylindrical "holes" through the material, each of which carries a magnetic flux quantum. Along these flux cylinders, the material is essentially in a normal, non-superconducting state, surrounded by a superconductor where the magnetic field goes back to zero. The width of each cylinder is on the order of the penetration depth for the material. As the magnetic field increases, the flux cylinders move closer together, and eventually at the upper critical field $H_\text{c2}$, they leave no room for the superconducting state and the zero-resistivity property is lost.

=== Lower critical field ===
The lower critical field is the magnetic flux density at which the magnetic flux starts to penetrate a type-II superconductor. At zero temperature, it is given by

$$H_{c1}=\frac{\Phi_0}{\pi \lambda^2},$$

where $\Phi_0$ is the magnetic flux quantum and $\lambda$ is the London penetration depth.

=== Upper critical field ===
The upper critical field is the magnetic flux density that completely suppresses superconductivity in a type-II superconductor at 0 K (absolute zero).

More properly, the upper critical field is a function of temperature (and pressure) and if these are not specified, absolute zero and standard pressure are implied.

Werthamer–Helfand–Hohenberg theory predicts the upper critical field (H_{c2}) at 0 K from T_{c} and the slope of H_{c2} at T_{c}.

The upper critical field (at 0 K) can also be estimated from the coherence length (ξ) using the Ginzburg–Landau expression to be

$$H_{c2}=\frac{\Phi_0}{2\pi\xi}.$$
