= RNS formalism =

Superstring quantization approach

In string theory, the Ramond–Neveu–Schwarz (RNS) formalism is an approach to formulating superstrings in which the worldsheet has explicit superconformal invariance but spacetime supersymmetry is hidden, in contrast to the Green–Schwarz formalism where the latter is explicit. It was originally developed by Pierre Ramond, André Neveu and John Schwarz in the RNS model in 1971, which gives rise to type II string theories and can also give type I string theory. Heterotic string theories can also be acquired through this formalism by using a different worldsheet action. There are various ways to quantize the string within this framework including light-cone quantization, old canonical quantization, and BRST quantization. A consistent string theory is only acquired if the spectrum of states is restricted through a procedure known as a GSO projection, with this projection being automatically present in the Green–Schwarz formalism.

== History ==
The discovery of the Veneziano amplitude describing the scattering of four mesons in 1968 launched the study of dual resonance models which generalized these scattering amplitudes to the scattering with any number of mesons. While these are S-matrix theories rather than quantum field theories, Yoichiro Nambu, Holger Bech Nielsen, and Leonard Susskind gave them a string interpretation, whereby mesons behave as strings of finite length.

In 1970 Pierre Ramond was working at Yale trying to extend the dual resonance models to include fermionic degrees of freedom through a generalization of the Dirac equation. This led him to construct a superalgebra, the Ramond superalgebra. At the same time, Andre Neveu and John Schwarz were working at Princeton to extend existing dual resonance models by adding to them anticommutating creation and annihilation operators. This originally gave rise to a model containing only bosons. Shortly after their second paper on this topic, they realized that their model can be combined with Ramond's fermionic model, which they successfully did to give rise to the Ramond–Neveu–Schwarz (RNS) model, referred to at the time as the dual pion model.

This work was done with only hadronic physics in mind with no reference to strings, until 1974 when Stanley Mandelstam reinterpreted the RNS model as a model for spinning strings. Joël Scherk and John Schwartz were the first to suggest that it may describe elementary particles rather than just hadrons when they showed that the spin-2 particle of the model behaves as a graviton.

At the time, the main issue with the RNS model was that it contained a tachyon as the lowest energy state. It was only in 1976 with the introduction of GSO projection by Ferdinando Gliozzi, Joël Scherk, and David Olive that the first consistent tachyon-free string theories were constructed.

== Overview ==
The RNS formalism is an approach to quantizing a string by working with the string worldsheet embedded in spacetime with both bosonic and fermionic fields on the worldsheet. There are a number of different approaches for quantizing the string in this formalism. The main ones are old covariant quantization, light-cone quantization, and BRST quantization via the path integral. The last approach starts from the Euclidean partition function

$$Z = \int \frac{1}{V_G} [\mathcal D \ \text{fields}]e^{-S},$$

where $S$ is the worldsheet action with some gauge symmetry group $G$ that represents an overcounting of the physically distinct configurations of the fields that the action depends on. This overcounting is eliminated by dividing by the volume of the gauge group $V_G$. BRST quantization proceeds by gauge fixing the path integral via the Fadeev–Popov procedure, which gives rise to a ghost action in addition to the now gauge fixed action.

The RNS model originates from using the $(1,1)$ supergravity action which upon gauge fixing gives the RNS action together with a ghost action describing holomorphic and antiholomorphic ghosts that are necessary to eliminate the unphysical temporal excitations of the fields. The physical states of this theory split up into a number of sectors depending on the periodicity condition of the fermionic fields. The full theory is inconsistent and contains an unphysical tachyon, however projecting out a number of these sectors can give rise to consistent tachyon-free theories. In particular, the RNS model gives rise to type IIA and type IIB string theory for closed strings, while combining the open string with a modified version of the IIB string gives rise to type I string theory. Starting instead from a $(1,0)$ supergravity action gives rise to heterotic string theories.

=== Constraint algebras ===
One way to classify all possible string theories that can be constructed using this formalism is by looking at the possible residual symmetry algebras that can arise. That is, gauge fixing does not always fully fix the entire gauge symmetry, but can instead leave behind some unfixed residual symmetry whose action keeps the gauge fixed action unchanged. The algebra corresponding to this residual symmetry is known as the constraint algebra. To give rise to a physical theory, this algebra must be imposed on the Hilbert space by projecting out unwanted states. Physical states are the ones that are annihilated by the action of this algebra on those states.

For example, in bosonic string theory the original diffeomorphism$\times$Weyl symmetry breaks down to a residual conformal symmetry, giving the conformal algebra whose generator is the stress-energy tensor $T^{ab}$. The physical states $|\psi\rangle$, $|\psi'\rangle$ are then those for which $\langle \psi|T^{ab}|\psi'\rangle = 0$. Similarly, gauge fixing the $(1,1)$ supergravity action down to the RNS action leaves behind a residual $(1,1)$ superconformal algebra.

Physical conditions such as unitarity and a positive number of spatial dimensions limits the number of admissible constraint algebras. Besides the conformal algebra and the $(1,1)$ superconformal algebra, the other allowed algebras are the $(1,0)$, $(1,2)$ and $(0,2)$ superconformal algebras. The first of these gives rise to heterotic string theories, while the other two give consistent but less physically interesting theories in low dimensions. Topological string theory is not found in this classification because for it the spin-statistics theorem does not hold in the conformal gauge which was required in the full argument.

== RNS action ==
A string worldsheet is a two dimensional surface which can be parameterized by two coordinates $(\sigma_1,\sigma_2)$ where $\sigma_2$ describes Euclidean time while $\sigma_1$ parameterize the string at an instance in time. For closed strings $\sigma_1\sim \sigma_1+2\pi$ while for open strings $\sigma_1 \in [0,\pi]$. Two other coordinate systems are often employed, these being complex coordinates $(w,\bar w)$ defined by $w=\sigma_1+i\sigma_2$ or the coordinates $(z,\bar z)$ defined by $z = e^{-iw}$. For the latter, a string at a given point in time is a circle around the origin in the complex plane, with smaller radii corresponding to earlier times.

The RNS model is formed using a $(1,1)$ superconformal field theory on the string worldsheet with an action of the form

$$S_{\text{RNS}} = \frac{1}{4\pi} \int d^2 z \bigg(\frac{2}{\alpha'}\partial X^\mu \bar \partial X_\mu + \psi^\mu \bar \partial \psi_\mu + \tilde \psi^\mu \partial \tilde \psi_\mu\bigg),$$

where $\psi^\mu(z)$ and $\tilde \psi^\mu(\bar z)$ are holomorphic and an antiholomorphic anticommutating fermionic fields and $X^\mu(z,\bar z)$ are bosonic fields. These bosonic fields have a physical interpretation as the coordinates of the string worldsheet embedded in spacetime, with $\mu$ running over the number of spacetime dimensions. For superstring theory in flat spacetime consistency of the theory requires exactly ten dimensions. The partial derivatives are derivatives in complex coordinates $\partial=\partial_z$ and $\bar \partial = \partial_{\bar z}$.

Operators can be classified according to their behavior under rigid rescaling $z'=\zeta z$. If they transform as $\mathcal O'(z',\bar z') = \zeta^{-h}\bar \zeta^{-\tilde h} \mathcal O(z,\bar z)$ they are said to have weight $(h, \tilde h)$. The weights of the two fermionic fields are $(1/2,0)$ and $(0,1/2)$ while that of the bosonic fields is $(0,0)$. The holomorphic stress-energy tensor has weight $(2,0)$ and is given by

$$T_B(z) = -\frac{1}{\alpha'}\partial X^\mu \partial X_\mu -\frac{1}{2}\psi^\mu \partial \psi_\mu.$$

The presence of worldsheet supersymmetry gives rise to worldsheet supercurrents with the holomorphic supercurrent having weight $(3/2,0)$ and being given by

$$T_F(z) = i\sqrt{2/\alpha'}\psi^\mu(z) \partial X_\mu(z).$$

Any holomorphic operator $\mathcal O(z)$ with weight $(h,0)$ can be expanded out as a Laurent series

$$\mathcal O(z) = \sum_{n \in \mathbb Z+\nu} \frac{\mathcal O_n}{z^{n+h}},$$

where $\mathcal O_n$ are known as the modes and $\nu = 0$ or $1/2$ depending on whether the operator is periodic or antiperiodic, respectively. The holomorphic stress-energy tensor and holomorphic supercurrent together form a closed algebra known as the $N=1$ super Virasoro algebra. Using a mode expansion where the stress tensor modes are given by $L_n$ and the supercurrent modes by $G_r$, the algebra takes the form

$$[L_m, L_n] = (m-n) L_{m+n}+\frac{c}{12}(m^3-m)\delta_{m,-n},$$
$$\{G_r, G_s\} = 2L_{r+s}+\frac{c}{12}(4r^2-1)\delta_{r,-s},$$
$$[L_m, G_r]=\frac{m-2r}{2}G_{m+r},$$

where $c$ is the central charge. The algebra is sometimes referred to as the Ramond algebra when $r$, $s$ are integers and the Neveu–Schwarz algebra when they are half-integers. For closed strings there are two copies of this algebra, one for the holomorphic and one for the antiholomorphic side, while for open strings there is only one copy.

=== Ramond and Neveu–Schwarz sectors ===
Closed strings are periodic in their spatial direction, a periodicity that must be respected by the fields living on the worldsheet. A Poincaré invariant theory must have periodic $X^\mu(\sigma_1,\sigma_2)$. For the fermionic fields, Lorentz invariance allows for two possible boundary condition; periodic or antiperiodic boundary conditions $\psi^\mu(\sigma_1+2\pi,\sigma_2) = \pm \psi^\mu(\sigma_1,\sigma_2)$, with an analogous condition for the antiholomorphic fields. This can concisely be summarized as

$$\psi^\mu(w+2\pi) = e^{2\pi i \nu}\psi^\mu(w), \ \ \ \ \ \ \ \ \tilde \psi^\mu(\bar w+2\pi) = e^{-2\pi i \tilde \nu}\tilde \psi^\mu(\bar w),$$

where $\nu$ and $\tilde \nu$ are independent of each other and are either $0$ or $1/2$. The periodic case ($\nu=0$) is known as the Ramond (R) boundary condition and the antiperiodic case ($\nu = 1/2$) is known as the Neveu–Schwarz (NS) boundary condition. This gives four possible ways of putting fermions on the closed string, giving rise to four sectors in the Hilbert space, the NS–NS, NS–R, R–NS, and R–R sectors. The periodicity of the supercurrents is inherited from the periodicity of the fermions.

For open strings, the boundary condition requires that the surface term in the equations of motion vanishes which imposes the constraints

$$\psi^\mu(0,\sigma^2)=e^{2\pi i \nu}\tilde \psi^\mu(0,\sigma^2), \ \ \ \ \ \ \ \psi^\mu(\pi,\sigma^2)=\tilde \psi^\mu(\pi, \sigma^2).$$

Thus, there are only two sectors for open strings, the R sector and the NS sector. It is often convenient to combine the two fields into a single field with an extended range $0\leq \sigma^1 \leq 2\pi$ defined according to

$$\psi^\mu(\sigma^1, \sigma^2) = \tilde \psi^\mu(2\pi-\sigma^1, \sigma^2),$$

where now the R and NS sectors correspond to a periodicity or antiperiodicity condition on this extended field.

=== Spectra ===
The Hilbert space of the R sector and NS sector are determined by considering the modes $\psi^\mu_r$ and $\tilde \psi^\mu_r$ of the fermionic fields. Since in the R sector the powers $r$ are integers, this sector has a branch cut while the NS sector has half-integer $r$ and so no branch cut. The operator product expansion (OPE) of the fermionic theory translate to anticommutation relations for the modes given by

$$\{\psi^\mu_r,\psi^\nu_s\} = \{\tilde \psi_r^\mu, \tilde \psi_s^\nu\} = \eta^{\mu\nu}\delta_{r,-s}.$$

The states in the Hilbert space can then be built up by acting with these modes on the vacuum state. Since all annihilation modes for the NS sector have $r>0$, it follows that its spectrum has a unique vacuum state $|0\rangle_{\text{NS}}$ that is annihilated by all the modes

$$\psi_r^\mu |0\rangle_{\text{NS}} = 0, \ \ \ \ \ \ \ r>0.$$

The $r<0$ modes act as raising operators, and since they are anticommuting, each one can be acted on at most once, giving the NS sector spectrum.

The R sector has zero modes $\psi_0^\mu$ which map a vacuum state into another vacuum state. Under the rescaling $\gamma^\mu = 2^{-1/2}\psi^\mu_0$, the anticommutating relation for these becomes the Dirac algebra, implying that the ground state of the R spectrum forms a representation of this algebra. In ten dimensions this is a Dirac spinor, a 32 dimensional representation which can be reduced down to two Weyl representations $\text{32}=\text{16}+\text{16}'$ distinguished by their chirality. The R sector spectrum is formed by acting with $r>0$ modes at most once on these ground states.

== Gauge fixing ==
The Lorentz covariant, diffeomorphism invariant action for the fermionic superstring is found by coupling the bosonic and fermionic fields to two-dimensional supergravity, giving the action

$$S = \int d^2ze\bigg[\frac{1}{2}\nabla_aX^\mu \cdot \nabla_a X^\mu -\frac{1}{2}i\bar \psi^\mu \gamma^a\nabla_a \psi^\mu+\frac{1}{2}i(\bar \chi_a \gamma^b \gamma^a\psi^\mu)\bigg(\partial_b X^\mu-\frac{1}{4}i\bar \chi_b\psi^\mu\bigg)\bigg],$$

where $e^m_a$ is the two-dimensional vielbein and $\chi_a$ is the corresponding gravitino. This has the following symmetries:

- Two-dimensional reparameterization invariance,
- Two-dimensional Lorentz invariance,
- Two-dimensional local supersymmetry,
- Weyl symmetry,
- Local S-symmetry; $\delta \psi_\alpha = \gamma_\alpha \zeta$, where $\zeta_A$ is a Majorana spinor,
- Poincare symmetry.

The gauge symmetries of this action are diffeomorphism symmetry, Weyl symmetry, and local supersymmetry. To quantize the action, these symmetries must be gauge fixed, which is usually done through the superconformal gauge in which $e^m_a = e^\phi \delta^m_a$ and $\chi_a = \gamma_a\xi$, where $\phi$ and $\xi$ decouple from the action. Performing this gauge fixing through the Faddeev–Popov procedure leaves behind the RNS action and a BRST ghost action $S \rightarrow S_{\text{RNS}}+S_g$.

=== Ghosts ===
There are holomorphic and antiholomorphic ghosts in the gauge fixed superstring action. On the holomorphic side are a pair of anticommutating $b$ and $c$ fields with weight $h_b=2$ and $h_c=-1$, along with a pair of commutating fields $\beta$ and $\gamma$ with weight $h_\beta = 3/2$ and $h_\gamma = 1/2$. These have an action of the form

$$S_g = \frac{1}{2\pi}\int d^2 z (b \bar \partial c+\beta \bar \partial \gamma),$$

with a similar action for the antiholomorphic ghosts. This action gives rise to additional ghost contributions to the overall stress energy tensor $T_B^g$ and supercurrents of the theory $T_F^g$.

The ghost mode expansion is determined by their weights, with the anticommutating ghosts fields being periodic, while the commutating ghost fields being periodic in the R sector and antiperiodic in the NS sector. The modes satisfy the (anti)commutation relations $\{b_m, c_n\} = \delta_{n,-m}$ and $[\gamma_r, \beta_s] = \delta_{r,-s}$. The Ramond and the Neveu–Schwarz ground states are defined according to

$$b_m|0\rangle_{\text{NS,R}} = 0, \ \ \ m\geq 0, \ \ \ \ c_m|0\rangle_{\text{NS,R}} = 0, \ \ \ m\geq 1,$$
$$\beta_r|0\rangle_{\text{NS}}=0, \ \ \ r\geq \tfrac{1}{2}, \ \ \ \ \gamma_r |0\rangle_{\text{NS}}=0, \ \ \ r \geq \tfrac{1}{2},$$
$$\beta_r |0\rangle_{\text{R}}=0, \ \ \ r\geq 0, \ \ \ \ \ \ \gamma_r |0\rangle_{\text{R}}=0, \ \ \ r\geq 1.$$

== Physical states ==
BRST quantization of the theory requires the construction of the BRST current

$$j_B = c T_B^m + \gamma T_F^m + \frac{1}{2}(cT_B^g + \gamma T_F^g),$$

where $c$ and $\gamma$ are the ghosts and $T_{B,F}^{m,g}$ are the matter and ghost stress tensors and supercurrents. The BRST charge $Q_B$ is the corresponding charge associated with this current

$$Q_B = \frac{1}{2\pi i} \oint (dz j_B - d\bar z \bar j_B).$$

The physical spectrum is the set of BRST cohomology classes. This is the set of states $|\psi\rangle$ that are annihilated by the charge $Q_B|\psi\rangle = 0$, with all states differing by a BRST exact state, also called a null state $Q_B|\eta\rangle$, being equivalent $|\psi \rangle \sim |\psi\rangle + Q_B|\eta\rangle$. There is the additional condition that $b_0|\psi\rangle = L_0|\psi\rangle = 0$, and for the R sector states $\beta_0|\psi\rangle = G_0|\psi\rangle = 0$. This condition truncates the ghost spectrum for kinematic reasons.

It is convenient to look at the lowest energy states of this theory. Introducing the fermion number operator $F$ allows for the NS and R sectors to be further subdivided into NS−, NS+, R−, and R+ sectors, where the sign denotes the sign of $e^{i\pi F}=\pm 1$ for the states.

- NS−: This contains the NS ground state $|0;k\rangle_{\text{NS}}$ which is a tachyon of mass $-1/2\alpha'$ and four-momentum $k^\mu$.
- NS+: This contains the NS first excited state $|e;k\rangle_{\text{NS}} = e\cdot \psi_{-1/2}|0;k\rangle_{\text{NS}}$ which corresponds to a massless vector boson with polarization $e$ satisfying $k^2 = e\cdot k = 0$ and $e^\mu \sim e^\mu+\lambda k^\mu$.
- R−/R+: The R sector ground state $|u;k\rangle_{\text{R}}$ is a massless Majorana–Weyl fermion with polarization $u_{\boldsymbol s}$, half of which belongs to the R+ sector and the other half to the R− sector.

These states are classified by what spin representation of the $\text{SO}(8)$ group they belong to, which is the rotation subgroup of the ten dimensional Lorentz group $\text{SO}(1,9) \supset \text{SO}(1,1)\text{SO}(8)$. In particular, the tachyonic NS− is a singlet while the NS+ state is a vector denoted by $8_v$. The R+ sector Majorana–Weyl spinors belong to the $8$ representation while the R− belong to the $8'$ representation.

For open strings, the NS+, NS−, R+, and R− form the possible massless and tachyonic states of the RNS string. For the closed strings, the physical states are the various combinations of these four sectors as left and right-moving sectors. The resulting string has a mass-shell condition of

$$\frac{\alpha'}{4}m^2 = N-\nu=\tilde N-\tilde \nu,$$

where $N$ is the level, counting the creation operators used to create the state. The resulting states can again be classified according to the $\text{SO}(8)$ representation, with this being the direct product of the left-moving and right-moving representations, which decomposes into a sum over irreducible representations. There are no states where NS− is matched with NS+, R− or R+ since then the level matching condition is not meet, so the closed string theory has a single tachyon coming from the NS−NS− sector.

=== GSO projection ===
The naive RNS string Hilbert space does not give rise to a consistent string theory. There are three conditions that must be satisfied for the theory to be consistent. First, the vertex operators of the theory have to be mutually local, meaning that their OPEs have no branch cuts. Secondly, the OPEs must also closed. Lastly, the one-loop amplitudes must be modular invariant. The GSO projection is the projection of the Hilbert space onto the subset of sectors that are consistent under these three conditions. One set of consistent theories that results from the projection are type 0 string theories, although these are not tachyon-free. The other set of consistent theories are type II string theories which are tachyon-free, consisting of the sectors

- IIA: (NS+,NS+), (R+,NS+), (NS+,R−), (R+,R−),
- IIB: (NS+,NS+), (R+,NS+), (NS+,R+), (R+,R+).

A concise way to summarize these sectors is that type IIA theory only keeps sectors with $e^{i\pi F} = +1$ and $e^{i \pi \tilde F} = (-1)^{\tilde \alpha}$, while IIB theory only keeps sectors with $e^{i\pi F} = e^{i\pi \tilde F} = +1$.

Type I string theory can be constructed from type IIB theory that has gauged its worldsheet parity symmetry and has been combined with the GSO projected open RNS string. The open strings must also have Chan–Paton factors belonging to the $\text{SO}(32)$ gauge group. This last condition arises from a requirement to make the theory non-anomalous. Heterotic string theories can be constructed using this same formalism, except starting with an action different from the RNS action.

== See also ==
- GS formalism
- GSO projection
- Kalb–Ramond field
