= Bouchiat =

Bouchiat is the surname of a family of notable French physicists:

- Claude Bouchiat (1932–2021), French physicist, husband of Marie-Anne and father of Hélène and Vincent
- Hélène Bouchiat (born 1958), French physicist, daughter of Claude and Marie-Anne, sister of Vincent
- Marie-Anne Bouchiat (born 1934), French physicist, wife of Claude and mother of Hélène and Vincent
- Vincent Bouchiat (born 1970), French physicist, son of Claude and Marie-Anne, brother of Hélène
