= Exceptional field theory =

Reformulation of supergravity

In physics, exceptional field theory is a reformulation or an extension of eleven-dimensional supergravity in which exceptional Lie group symmetries are manifest. Exceptional group symmetries such as E_{n(n)} are manifestations of U-duality in the context of M-theory.

== Background ==
In 1979, Eugène Cremmer and Bernard Julia found that E_{7(7)} symmetries are present upon toroidal compactification of 11-dimensional supergravity to 4 dimensions. In 1985, Bernard de Wit and Hermann Nicolai reformulated eleven-dimensional supergravity in a way that has manifest gauge invariance under SU(8), a subgroup of E_{7(7)}. The theory was extended in 2013 by Henning Samtleben and Olaf Hohm to have E_{6(6)}, E_{7(7)}, and E_{8(8)} symmetries, calling such theories under the term, exceptional field theory. Early attempts to make duality symmetries manifest in supergravity involved the development of generalized geometry by Coimbra, Strickland-Constable, and Waldram.

Exceptional field theory has been applied to construct consistent Kaluza-Klein truncations of supergravity using generalized Scherk-Schwarz ansätze, an important step for ensuring that solutions of the lower-dimensional theory are solutions of the higher-dimensional theory. In particular, it was utilized to derive explicit non-linear reduction formulas showing that type IIB supergravity on AdS_{5}×S^{5} admits a consistent truncation to five-dimensional maximal SO(6) gauged supergravity, confirming a previously conjectured result.

Exceptional field theory has also been used to study the Kaluza-Klein mass spectrum of fluctuations around compactification backgrounds in supergravity. These techniques can be applied for computations of the mass spectrum and interactions of Kaluza-Klein modes for both maximally supersymmetric and less symmetric, or non-supersymmetric backgrounds.

== See also ==
- T-duality
- Double field theory
