= Werner Nahm =

German theoretical physicist

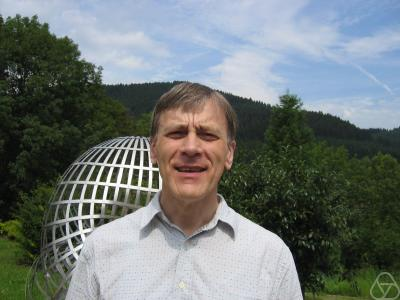
- Nahm in 2004
- Born: 21 March 1949 (age 77); Münster (Selters), Hesse, Germany
- Education: Johann Wolfgang Goethe-Universität Frankfurt am Main, Ludwig-Maximilians-Universität München, 1970
- Known for: Nahm equations D=11 is the largest number of dimensions consistent with a single graviton in supergravity theories
- Scientific career
- Fields: Theoretical physics
- Workplaces: University of Bonn, Dublin Institute for Advanced Studies
- Doctoral students: Katrin Wendland; Melanie Becker; Ralph Kaufmann

Werner Nahm (German: [naːm]; born 21 March 1949) is a German theoretical physicist. He has made contributions to mathematical physics and fundamental theoretical physics.

== Life and work ==
Werner Nahm attended Gymnasium Philippinum Weilburg. After high school he studied from 1966 at the Johann Wolfgang Goethe-Universität Frankfurt am Main and the Ludwig-Maximilians-Universität München, where he earned his diploma in physics in 1970. He received his doctorate in 1972 at the University of Bonn, his dissertation was titled Analytical solution of the statistical bootstrap model, where he was then to 1975 as a post-doctoral student. From 1976 to 1982 he was a scientist at CERN.

From 1982 he was a Heisenberg fellow again at the University of Bonn. In 1986 he became associate professor at the University of California, Davis. 1989 to 2002 he was a full professor at the University of Bonn. Since 2002 he is one of three senior professors at the School of Theoretical Physics at the Dublin Institute for Advanced Studies and since 2007 its director. He is a foreign member of the Max Planck Institute for Mathematics in Bonn.

In the 1970s he worked with elementary theory, for example, bootstrap models (the subject of his dissertation) and the classification of graded Lie algebras, which are important in supersymmetric theories. After that, he worked mainly on the theory of magnetic monopoles, classification of supersymmetric models, conformal field theories and their algebraic classification, and classification of string models. The Nahm equations (1981) are named after him, used in (for example) for the description of monopoles in Yang–Mills theories, and the Nahm transform.

In 1978 he showed that the maximum dimension of supersymmetric theories was d = 11. His predicted eleven-dimensional supergravity theory was constructed shortly after by Eugène Cremmer, Bernard Julia and Joël Scherk. Since supersymmetric theories are now favoured in the context of Kaluza–Klein theories as candidates for unified field theories of elementary particles (M theory), Nahm also determined the maximum number of eligible space-time dimensions.

Nahm also conducted research about the Mayan civilisation and their astronomy, for example, the role of Venus (and their phases) in terms of calendar prediction that was important for their planning of wars. In his Mayan research, he also worked with Linda Schele and Nikolai Grube and participated in the ongoing decipherment of Maya hieroglyphs. He also found evidence of supernova events and the observation of Mercury in the Mayan writings.

His doctoral and diploma students include Katrin Becker, Melanie Becker, Ralph Blumenhagen, Sayipjamal Dulat, Michael Flohr, Andreas Honecker, Ralph Kaufmann, Johannes Kellendonk, Andreas Malmendier, Andreas Recknagel, Daniel Roggenkamp, and Katrin Wendland in academia, and Holger Eberle, Wolfgang Eholzer, Michael Terhoeven, and Raimund Varnhagen in industry.

== Other affiliations ==
- Member of the Royal Irish Academy
- Member of the Academy of Sciences and Literature Mainz
- Member (Fellow) of the Royal Society

== Prizes and awards ==
- 2012 Gothenburg Lise Meitner Prize of TH Chalmers
- 2013 Max Planck Medal
- 2014 Royal Irish Academy Gold Medal in Physical and Mathematical Sciences

== Works ==
- Conformally invariant quantum field theories in two dimensions. World Scientific. 1995.
- Edited with Ling-Lie Chau: Differential geometric methods in theoretical physics: physics and geometry (18. International Conference on differential geometric methods in theoretical physics, University of California, Davis 1988). Plenum Press. 1990.
- Edited: Interface between physics and mathematics, (Hangzhou 1993 Konferenz). World Scientific. 1994.
- Edited: Trieste Conference on topological methods in Quantum Field Theory. World Scientific. 1991.
- N. Craigie (1986). Mathematical structures underlying monopoles in gauge theories (Theory and detection of magnetic monopoles in gauge theories). World Scientific.
- Nahm, Werner (1 January 1987). "Quantum field theories in one and two dimensions". Duke Mathematical Journal. 54 (2). Duke University Press. doi:10.1215/s0012-7094-87-05424-x. ISSN 0012-7094.
- P. Cartier (2007). Conformal field theory and torsion elements of the Bloch group. Frontiers in Number Theory, Physics and Geometry. Vol. 2. Springer Verlag.
