= André Neveu =

French physicist (born 1946)

- Born: August 28, 1946 (age 80); Paris, France
- Education: École Normale Supérieure; University of Paris XI
- Known for: RNS formalism Neveu–Schwarz algebra Neveu–Schwarz B-field; Gross–Neveu model
- Awards: Dirac Medal (2020); Three Physicists Prize (2005); Prix Paul Langevin (1973); Peccot Lectures (1974-1975); Procter Fellowship
- Scientific career
- Fields: Theoretical physics
- Doctoral advisor: Claude Bouchiat; Philippe Meyer

André Neveu (French: [nəvø]; born 28 August 1946) is a French physicist working on string theory and quantum field theory who coinvented the Neveu–Schwarz algebra and the Gross–Neveu model.

== Biography ==
Neveu studied in Paris at the École Normale Supérieure (ENS). In 1969, he received his diploma (Thèse de troisième cycle) at University of Paris XI in Orsay with Philippe Meyer and Claude Bouchiat and in 1971 he completed his doctorate (Doctorat d'État) there.

In 1969, he and his classmate from ENS and Orsay, Joël Scherk, together with John H. Schwarz and David Gross at Princeton University, examined divergences in one-loop diagrams of the bosonic string theory (and discovered the cause of tachyon divergences). From 1971 to 1974, Neveu was at the Laboratory for High Energy Physics of the University of Paris XI where he and Scherk showed that spin-1 excitations of strings could describe Yang–Mills theories. In 1971, Neveu with John Schwarz in Princeton developed, at the same time as Pierre Ramond (1971), the first string theory that also described fermions (called RNS formalism after its three originators). This was an early appearance of the ideas of supersymmetry which were being developed independently at that time by several groups. A few years later, Neveu, working in Princeton with David Gross, developed the Gross–Neveu model. With Roger Dashen and Brosl Hasslacher, he examined, among other things, quantum-field-theoretic models of extended hadrons and semiclassical approximations in quantum field theory which are reflected in the DHN method of the quantization of solitons. From 1972 to 1977, Neveu was at the Institute for Advanced Study while spending half of the time in Orsay. From 1974 to 1983, he was at the Laboratory for Theoretical Physics of the ENS and from 1983 to 1989 in the theory department at CERN. From 1975, he was Maitre de recherche in the CNRS and from 1985 Directeur de recherche. From 1989, he was at the Institute (Laboratory) for Theoretical Physics of the University of Montpellier II (now L2C, Laboratory Charles Coulomb). From 1994 to 1995, he was a visiting professor in the University of California, Berkeley.

In 1973, Neveu received the Paul Langevin Prize of the Société Française de Physique. In 1988, he received the Gentner-Kastler Prize awarded jointly by the Société Française de Physique and the Deutsche Physikalische Gesellschaft (DPG). In 2020m he was awarded the Dirac Medal of the ICTP.

== Writings ==
- Neveu, A. (1988), "Introduction to Strings and Superstrings", Physikalische Blätter, 44 (7): 195, doi:10.1002/phbl.19880440709 (On the occasion of the awarding of the Gentner-Kastler Prize)
- Neveu, A. (1982), "Dual resonance models and strings in QCD", in Zuber, Jean-Bernard; Stora, Raymond (eds.), Recent Advances in Field Theory and Statistical Mechanics, Les Houches, France, Aug 2 – Sep 10, 1982, Les Houches Summer School Proceedings, vol. 39, p. 760
