= Ferdinando Gliozzi =

Italian physicist

- Born: 5 April 1940 (age 86); Turin, Italy
- Education: University of Turin
- Known for: GSO projection
- Scientific career
- Fields: Theoretical physics
- Workplaces: Istituto Nazionale di Fisica Nucleare; University of Turin

Ferdinando Gliozzi (Italian: [ferdiˈnando ʎˈʎɔttsi]; born 1940) is a string theorist at the Istituto Nazionale di Fisica Nucleare. Along with David Olive and Joël Scherk, he proposed the GSO projection to map out the tachyonic states in the Neveu–Schwarz sector.
