= Olaf Hohm =

German theoretical physicist

Olaf Hohm is a German theoretical physicist and professor at Humboldt University of Berlin. He has worked on massive gravity, double field theory, exceptional field theory and applications of $L_\infty$-algebras in field theory.

== Education ==
Hohm earned his PhD from the University of Hamburg in 2006, where his advisor was Henning Samtleben.

== Career ==
Following his PhD, Hohm conducted research at Utrecht University, University of Groningen, and at the Massachusetts Institute of Technology. In 2009, together with Eric Bergshoeff and Paul Townsend, he developed a consistent non-linear theory of massive gravity in 2+1 dimensions, called "New Massive Gravity", extending the linear theory of Fierz and Pauli from 1939.

In 2010, together with Chris Hull and Barton Zwiebach, he co-developed double field theory.

From 2011 to 2013, Hohm served as Akademischer Rat at LMU Munich, after which he was awarded a Heisenberg Fellowship and returned to work at MIT and the Simons Center for Geometry and Physics. In 2013, he and Samtleben formulated exceptional field theory.

In 2018, he received an ERC Consolidator Grant and joined Humboldt University of Berlin, where he became a professor in 2022.
