= Claus Montonen =

Finnish theoretical physicist (born 1946)

Claus K. Montonen
- Born: 1946
- Education: University of Helsinki (MSc, 1968); University of Cambridge (PhD, 1974)
- Known for: Montonen–Olive duality
- Scientific career
- Fields: Physics
- Workplaces: University of Paris-Sud; CNRS; CERN; University of Helsinki; Helsinki Institute of Physics
- Thesis: Theory of Dual Resonance Models (1973)

Claus Kalevi Montonen (born 1946) is a Finnish theoretical physicist, most known for his work with British physicist David Olive in proposing the Montonen–Olive duality.

== Life ==
Claus Montonen received his MSc from the University of Helsinki in 1968 and his PhD at the University of Cambridge in 1974, where he was taught by David Olive before he left for CERN. He held research fellowships at Orsay, CNRS and CERN. From 1974 he has held various research and teaching positions at the University of Helsinki and Helsinki Institute of Physics.

=== Publications ===
In 1977 while at CERN Montonen, together with Olive, made the remarkable conjecture that there should exist an electromagnetic dual theory in which the roles of magnetic monopoles and gauge bosons are interchanged. The Montonen-Olive duality was later found to emerge from a deeper web of dualities underlying M-theory, ushering in the second superstring revolution of the mid 1990s, through the work of Ed Witten and others.
