= GS formalism =

Superstring quantization approach

Green–Schwarz (GS) formalism (named after Michael Green and John H. Schwarz) is an attempt to introduce fermions in string theory. The theory is equivalent to RNS formalism which has been GSO projected. This theory is very hard to quantize, being straightforward to quantize only in light cone gauge. A covariant quantization of spinning string, maintaining space-time supersymmetry manifest, is possible in a formalism inspired on the GS formalism, known as pure spinor formalism.

== See also ==
- Supersymmetry
- RNS formalism
