= Katrin Becker =

German theoretical physicist (born 1967)

- Occupations: Theoretical physicist and professor at Texas A&M

Academic background
- Education: University of Bonn University of California, Santa Barbara California Institute of Technology

Academic work
- Discipline: Physicist
- Sub-discipline: Theoretical physicist specializing in string theory
- Institutions: Texas A&M

Katrin Becker (born Gelsenkirchen, Germany, October 7, 1967) is a theoretical physicist and textbook author specializing in string theory. She is a professor of physics at Texas A&M University.

== Life and work ==
Becker earned her diploma under Werner Nahm at the University of Bonn where she also received her doctorate in 1994 with a dissertation titled, Strings, black holes and conformal field theory. She was a postdoctoral fellow at the Kavli Institute at the University of California, Santa Barbara (UCSB) and then a senior research fellow at California Institute of Technology (Caltech) with John Henry Schwarz. She became an assistant professor at the University of Utah before moving to Texas A&M University in 2005.

Becker deals with string theory, for example in the development of models that make predictions for the Standard Model and realize models of inflation in cosmology. She worked closely with her sister, physicist Melanie Becker (also a professor at Texas A&M), with whom she wrote a popular string theory textbook along with John Henry Schwarz.

A general description of Katrin Becker's physics research has been published:

In our quest for the fundamental laws of nature, we are led to wonder how to construct a theory of quantum gravity, a theory that reconciles gravity with quantum physics. Prof. K. Becker works on string theory. This is a quantum theory that predicts gravitation instead of contradicting it and it could be the unified theory of nature. It is a fascinating and unique framework.

In 2003, she received a Alfred P. Sloan Foundation Research Fellowship, and in 2005, a Radcliffe Fellowship.

In 2017, she received the Bush Excellence Award for Faculty in International Research

== Personal life ==
Katrin Becker was born in Gelsenkirchen, Germany to Ingrid and Karl-Hans Becker on October 7, 1967. She grew up in Malaga, Spain, with her older sister Melanie Becker, and the two sisters were recruited to Texas A&M in 2005 as part of a faculty reinvestment program. Katrin survived her sister and collaborator Melanie who died in 2020 after a long fight with cancer.

== Selected works ==
- Katrin Becker, Daniel Butter, William D. Linch, and Anindya Sengupta. “Components of eleven-dimensional supergravity with four off-shell supersymmetries.” Journal of High Energy Physics, 2021(7), Jul 2021.
- Katrin Becker, Melanie Becker, Daniel Butter, William D. Linch, and Stephen Randall. “Five-dimensional supergravity in N = 1/2 superspace.” Journal of High Energy Physics, 2020(3), Mar 2020.
- Katrin Becker and Daniel Butter. “4D = 1 Kaluza-Klein superspace.” Journal of High Energy Physics, 2020(9), Sep 2020.
- Katrin Becker, Melanie Becker, Daniel Butter, and William D. Linch. “N = 1 supercurrents of eleven-dimensional supergravity.” Journal of High Energy Physics, 2018(5), May 2018.
- Katrin Becker, Melanie Becker, William D. Linch, Stephen Randall, and Daniel Robbins. “All Chern-Simons invariants of 4D, N = 1 gauged superform hierarchies.” Journal of High Energy Physics, 2017(4), Apr 2017.
- Katrin Becker, Melanie Becker, John Schwarz: String Theory and M-Theory. A modern introduction. Cambridge University Press 2007, ISBN 0-521-86069-5
