= Nielsen–Olesen vortex =

Type of topological defect

In theoretical physics, a Nielsen–Olesen vortex is a point-like object localized in two spatial dimensions or, equivalently, a classical solution of field theory with the same property. This particular solution occurs if the configuration space of scalar fields contains non-contractible circles. A circle surrounding the vortex at infinity may be "wrapped" once on the other circle in the configuration space. A configuration with this non-trivial topological property is called the Nielsen–Olesen vortex. The solution is formally identical to the solution of quantum vortex in superconductor.

It is named after Holger Bech Nielsen and Poul Olesen who developed the idea in 1973.

== See also ==
- Nielsen–Olsen string
- Abrikosov vortex
- Montonen–Olive duality
- S-duality
