= Primon gas =

Model from mathematical physics

In mathematical physics, the primon gas or Riemann gas discovered by Bernard Julia is a model illustrating correspondences between number theory and methods in quantum field theory, statistical mechanics and dynamical systems such as the Lee–Yang theorem. It is a quantum field theory of a set of non-interacting particles, the primons; it is called a gas or a free model because the particles are non-interacting. The idea of the primon gas was independently discovered by Donald Spector. Later works by Ioannis Bakas and Mark Bowick, and Spector explored the connection of such systems to string theory.

== The model ==
=== State space ===
Consider a Hilbert space H with an orthonormal basis of states $|p\rangle$ labelled by the prime numbers p. Second quantization gives a new Hilbert space K, the bosonic Fock space on H, where states describe collections of primes - which we can call primons if we think of them as analogous to particles in quantum field theory. This Fock space has an orthonormal basis given by finite multisets of primes. In other words, to specify one of these basis elements we can list the number $k_p = 0 , 1, 2, \dots$ of primons for each prime $p$:

$$|k_2, k_3, k_5, k_7, k_{11}, \ldots, k_p, \ldots\rangle$$

where the total $\sum_p k_p$ is finite. Since any positive natural number $n$ has a unique factorization into primes:

$$n = 2^{k_2} \cdot 3^{k_3} \cdot 5^{k_5} \cdot 7^{k_7} \cdot 11^{k_{11}} \cdots p^{k_p} \cdots$$

we can also denote the basis elements of the Fock space as simply $|n\rangle$ where $n = 1,2,3, \dots.$

In short, the Fock space for primons has an orthonormal basis given by the positive natural numbers, but we think of each such number $n$ as a collection of primons: its prime factors, counted with multiplicity.

=== Identifying the Hamiltonian via the Koopman operator ===
Given the state $x_n = n$, we may use the Koopman operator $\Phi$ to lift dynamics from the space of states to the space of observables:

$$\Phi \circ \textbf{log} \circ x_n = \textbf{log} \circ F \circ x_n = \textbf{log} \circ x_{n+1}$$

where $\textbf{log}$ is an algorithm for integer factorisation, analogous to the discrete logarithm, and $F$ is the successor function. Thus, we have:

$$\textbf{log} \circ x_n = \bigoplus_k a_k \cdot \ln p_k$$

A precise motivation for defining the Koopman operator $\Phi$ is that it represents a global linearisation of $F$, which views linear combinations of eigenstates as integer partitions. In fact, the reader may easily check that the successor function is not a linear function:

$$\forall n \in \mathbb{N}, F(n) = n+1 \implies \forall x,y \in \mathbb{N}^*, F(x+y) \neq F(x)+F(y)$$

Hence, $\Phi$ is canonical.

=== Energies ===
If we take a simple quantum Hamiltonian H to have eigenvalues proportional to log p, that is,

$$H|p\rangle = E_p |p\rangle$$

with

$$E_p=E \log p$$

for some positive constant $E$, we are naturally led to

$$E_n = \sum_p k_p E_p = E \cdot \sum_p k_p \log p = E \log n$$

=== Statistics of the phase-space dimension ===
Let's suppose we would like to know the average time, suitably-normalised, that the Riemann gas spends in a particular subspace. How might this frequency be related to the dimension of this subspace?

If we characterize distinct linear subspaces as Erdős-Kac data which have the form of sparse binary vectors, using the Erdős–Kac theorem we may actually demonstrate that this frequency depends upon nothing more than the dimension of the subspace. In fact, if $\omega(n)$ counts the number of unique prime divisors of $n \in \mathbb{N}$ then the Erdős–Kac law tells us that for large $n$:

$$\frac{\omega(n)-\ln \ln n}{\sqrt{\ln \ln n}} \sim \mathcal{N}(0,1)$$

has the standard normal distribution.

What is even more remarkable is that although the Erdős-Kac theorem has the form of a statistical observation, it could not have been discovered using statistical methods. Indeed, for $X \sim U([1,N])$ the normal order of $\omega(X)$ only begins to emerge for $N \geq 10^{100}$.

=== Statistical mechanics ===
The partition function Z of the primon gas is given by the Riemann zeta function:

$$Z(T) := \sum_{n=1}^\infty \exp \left(\frac{-E_n}{k_\text{B} T}\right) = \sum_{n=1}^\infty \exp \left(\frac{-E \log n}{k_\text{B} T}\right) = \sum_{n=1}^\infty \frac{1}{n^s} = \zeta (s)$$

with s = E/k_{B}T where k_{B} is the Boltzmann constant and T is the absolute temperature.

The divergence of the zeta function at s = 1 corresponds to the divergence of the partition function at a Hagedorn temperature of T_{H} = E/k_{B}.

== Supersymmetric model ==
The above second-quantized model takes the particles to be bosons. If the particles are taken to be fermions, then the Pauli exclusion principle prohibits multi-particle states which include squares of primes. By the spin–statistics theorem, field states with an even number of particles are bosons, while those with an odd number of particles are fermions. The fermion operator (−1)^{F} has a very concrete realization in this model as the Möbius function $\mu(n)$, in that the Möbius function is positive for bosons, negative for fermions, and zero on exclusion-principle-prohibited states.

== More complex models ==
The connections between number theory and quantum field theory can be somewhat further extended into connections between topological field theory and K-theory, where, corresponding to the example above, the spectrum of a ring takes the role of the spectrum of energy eigenvalues, the prime ideals take the role of the prime numbers, the group representations take the role of integers, group characters taking the place the Dirichlet characters, and so on.
