= Katrin Wendland =

German mathematical physicist

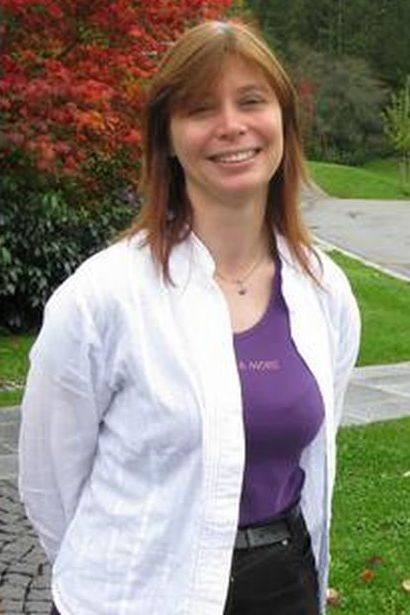
Wendland in 2010

Katrin Wendland (born 1970) is a German mathematical physicist who works as a professor at Trinity College Dublin.

Wendland earned a diploma in mathematics from the University of Bonn in 1996, and a PhD in physics from the University of Bonn in 2000, under the supervision of Werner Nahm. After being a lecturer and then senior lecturer at the University of Warwick from 2002 to 2006, she returned to Germany as a professor at the University of Augsburg, where she held the Chair for Analysis and Geometry. She moved to Albert-Ludwigs-Universität Freiburg in 2011 and then to Trinity College Dublin in 2022.

In 2009, Wendland was given the Medal for special merits for Bavaria in a united Europe by the Bavarian government. In 2010 she was an invited speaker at the International Congress of Mathematicians, with a talk entitled "On the geometry of singularities in quantum field theories". In 2012 she became one of the inaugural fellows of the American Mathematical Society. She was elected to the Akademie der Wissenschaften und der Literatur in 2013. In 2023 she was elected a fellow of Trinity College Dublin.
