= Melanie Becker =

German-American physicist (1966–2020)

- Born: 12 August 1966; Ahaus, Germany
- Died: 13 March 2020 (aged 53)
- Education: Instituto Nacional de Enseñanza Mixto de Torremolinos; University of Bonn
- Scientific career
- Workplaces: California Institute of Technology, University of Maryland, Texas A&M University
- Thesis: Non-perturbative approache to 2D-supergravity and super Virasoro constraints (1994)
- Doctoral advisor: Werner Nahm, Luis Alvarez-Gaume

Melanie Becker (1966–2020) was a German-American physicist known for her research into string theory. She was a tenured professor of physics at Texas A&M University.

== Early life and education ==
Melanie Becker was originally from Germany but grew up in Malaga, Spain where she graduated from Instituto Nacional de Enseñanza Mixto de Torremolinos in 1987. She received her Diplom in physics focusing on String Theory from the University of Bonn in 1994 while working with Werner Nahm. She simultaneously worked with Luis Álvarez-Gaumé at the particle accelerator at CERN when earning her Diplom. Following her Ph.D, Melanie Becker was in California first as a postdoctoral fellow at the University of California, Santa Barbara until 1997, when she transitioned to the California Institute of Technology as a senior research fellow working with John H. Schwarz. In 2000 she moved to the University of Maryland as an assistant professor marking the start of her independent academic career. In 2005 she moved to Texas A&M University where she was given tenure on arrival and became a member of the George P. and Cynthia Woods Michell Institute for Fundamental Physics and Astronomy.

== Career ==
Becker's research centered on the study of gravity and similar theories, with a particulate interest in string theory, M-theory, and quantum gravity. Becker's work included developing models for superstring compactification and, working with her sister Katrin Becker, she developed one for the Kaluza–Klein theory.

As she accepted her position to be a professor of physics at Texas A&M in 2005, Melanie was given the opportunity to work alongside her sister, Katrin Becker, to further their studies and specialization in string theory. In general, the models that Melanie developed compared the outcomes from standard elementary particle physics and cosmology.

Being distinguished as a Harvard Radcliffe Institute for Advanced Study Science Fellow in 2005, Becker focused her work during her time here on developing models from string theory that could reproduce experimental data measured within particle accelerators in relation to cosmological data. This stems from her graduate research conducted at the European Organization for Nuclear Research (CERN), where the models studied are known as "compactifications of string theory on manifolds with torsion."

In 2006 Becker, her sister Katrin Becker, and John Schwartz published a graduate-level textbook on string theory and M-theory.

Hosted by the Institute for Advanced Study, Becker was invited as a lecturer for their 2010 Prospects in Theoretical Physics (PiTP) program titled Aspects of Supersymmetry.

== Personal life ==
Melanie Becker was born to Ingrid and Karl-Hans Becker in Ahaus, Germany, on 12 August 1966. She grew up in Malaga, Spain, with her younger sister Katrin Becker. Becker and her younger sister moved to College Station and were recruited to Texas A&M in 2005 as part of a faculty reinvestment program. She lived there for the rest of her life. Melanie Becker died on 13 March 2020 at the age of 53, after a year-long fight with cancer.

== Awards and honors ==
In 2001 Becker received a fellowship from the Alfred P. Sloan Foundation. In 2004 she received a fellowship from the Research Internships in Science and Engineering (RISE) for the development of string theory among young undergraduate female students. In 2005 she received the Edward, Frances and Shirley B. Daniels fellowship from the Harvard Radcliffe Institute.

== Selected publications ==
- Becker, Katrin; Becker, Melanie; Schwarz, John H. (2006). String Theory and M-Theory: A Modern Introduction. Cambridge University Press. ISBN 0-521-86069-5.
- Becker, Katrin; Becker, Melanie; Strorninger, Andrew (1995-12-04). "Fivebranes, membranes and non-perturbative string theory". Nuclear Physics B. 456 (1): 130–152. arXiv:hep-th/9507158. Bibcode:1995NuPhB.456..130B. doi:10.1016/0550-3213(95)00487-1. ISSN 0550-3213. S2CID 14043557.
- Becker, Katrin; Becker, Melanie (1996-10-07). "M-theory on eight-manifolds". Nuclear Physics B. 477 (1): 155–167. arXiv:hep-th/9605053. Bibcode:1996NuPhB.477..155B. doi:10.1016/0550-3213(96)00367-7. ISSN 0550-3213. S2CID 15709187.
- Becker, Katrin; Becker, Melanie; Polchinski, Joseph; Tseytlin, Arkady (1997-09-15). "Higher order graviton scattering in M(atrix) theory". Physical Review D. 56 (6): R3174–R3178. arXiv:hep-th/9706072. Bibcode:1997PhRvD..56.3174B. doi:10.1103/PhysRevD.56.R3174. ISSN 0556-2821. S2CID 17353629.
- Becker, Katrin; Becker, Melanie; Dasgupta, Keshav; Green, Paul S (2003-04-03). "Compactifications of heterotic theory on non-Kähler complex manifolds, I". Journal of High Energy Physics. 2003 (4): 007. arXiv:hep-th/0301161. Bibcode:2003JHEP...04..007B. doi:10.1088/1126-6708/2003/04/007. ISSN 1029-8479. S2CID 6834444.
- Becker, Melanie; Leblond, Louis; Shandera, Sarah (2007-12-28). "Inflation from wrapped branes". Physical Review D. 76 (12) 123516. arXiv:0709.1170. Bibcode:2007PhRvD..76l3516B. doi:10.1103/PhysRevD.76.123516. ISSN 1550-7998. S2CID 119276463.
