= Nielsen–Olesen string =

Type of topological defect

In theoretical physics, Nielsen–Olesen string is a one-dimensional object or equivalently a classical solution of certain equations of motion. The solution does not depend on the direction along the string; the dependence on the other two, transverse dimensions is identical as in the case of a Nielsen–Olesen vortex.

It is named after Holger Bech Nielsen and Poul Olesen who developed the concept in 1973.
