= (−1)F =

Term in quantum field theory

In a quantum field theory with fermions, (−1)^{F} is a unitary, Hermitian, involutive operator where F is the fermion number operator. For the example of particles in the Standard Model, it is equal to the sum of the lepton number plus the baryon number, F = B + L. The action of this operator is to multiply bosonic states by 1 and fermionic states by −1. This is always a global internal symmetry of any quantum field theory with fermions and corresponds to a rotation by 2π. This splits the Hilbert space into two superselection sectors. Bosonic operators commute with (−1)^{F} whereas fermionic operators anticommute with it.

This operator really shows its utility in supersymmetric theories. Its trace is the spectral asymmetry of the fermion spectrum, and can be understood physically as the Casimir effect.

== See also ==
- Parity (physics)
- Witten index
- Primon gas
- Möbius function
