= Steve Lamoreaux =

American experimental physicist

Steven K. Lamoreaux
- Citizenship: American
- Education: University of Washington (B.S., Ph.D. 1986); University of Oregon (M.S.)
- Known for: Precision measurement of the Casimir effect Neutron electric dipole moment
- Awards: Francis M. Pipkin Award (1999, inaugural); Henderson Prize (1987); Los Alamos Laboratory Fellow
- Scientific career
- Fields: Atomic, molecular, and optical physics Dark matter Precision measurement
- Workplaces: Yale University; Los Alamos National Laboratory; University of Washington; Institut Laue–Langevin
- Doctoral advisor: E. Norval Fortson
- Website: lamoreauxgroup.yale.edu

Steven K. Lamoreaux is an American experimental physicist and the Eugene Higgins Professor of Physics at Yale University. His research centers on precision measurements, atomic physics, and experimental searches for dark matter. He is known for high-precision measurement of the Casimir force and for leading the HAYSTAC dark matter experiment.

== Education and early career ==
Lamoreaux received his B.S. in 1981 from the University of Washington and his M.S. from the University of Oregon in 1982. He earned his Ph.D. in 1986 from the University of Washington under E. Norval Fortson, developing precision experimental techniques using optically pumped mercury to test spatial isotropy and time reversal symmetry. His dissertation received the Henderson Prize for outstanding dissertation from the University of Washington in 1987.

Following his doctorate, Lamoreaux was a postdoctoral researcher at the Institut Laue–Langevin in Grenoble, France, where he worked on a US–UK ultracold neutron electric dipole moment experiment led by Norman Ramsey. He returned to the University of Washington as a Research Associate Professor, where he conducted research on ultracold neutrons, precision laser spectroscopy, and proposed a new technique to measure the neutron electric dipole moment that is currently under development at the Spallation Neutron Source at Oak Ridge National Laboratory.

== Los Alamos National Laboratory ==
Lamoreaux joined Los Alamos National Laboratory in November 1996, where he became a Laboratory Fellow. At Los Alamos, he led the Dynamic Materials (Weapons Physics) Team, which developed techniques for the Stockpile Stewardship program. He also conducted research in quantum cryptography, quantum computing, and ultracold neutron physics.

== Yale University ==
Lamoreaux joined the faculty at Yale University in 2006. In November 2024, he was appointed the Eugene Higgins Professor of Physics.

== Research ==
Lamoreaux operates small-scale tabletop precision measurement experiments designed to test fundamental physical laws.

=== Casimir effect ===
In 1997, Lamoreaux published high-precision measurement of the Casimir effect, the attractive force between uncharged conducting surfaces arising from quantum vacuum fluctuations of the electromagnetic field. Using a torsion pendulum apparatus, he measured the force between a spherical lens and a flat plate at separations ranging from 0.6 to 6 micrometers, obtaining results within five percent of theoretical predictions. The result was widely reported, including in The New York Times.

Lamoreaux and collaborators subsequently made observations of the thermal Casimir force, confirming the temperature-dependent contribution to the Casimir effect predicted at large separations.

=== Dark matter and axions ===
Lamoreaux is the Principal Investigator of the Haloscope At Yale Sensitive To Axion CDM (HAYSTAC) experiment. The HAYSTAC collaboration—comprising Yale University, the University of California, Berkeley, the University of Colorado Boulder, and Johns Hopkins University—searches for galactic cold dark matter in the form of axions. The experiment relies on resonant microwave cavities operating at cryogenic temperatures to detect potential axion-to-photon conversion.

HAYSTAC was among the first experiments, along with LIGO, to use squeezed quantum states to improve detector sensitivity beyond the standard quantum limit of linear amplifiers.

=== Ultracold neutrons ===
Lamoreaux proposed a technique to measure the permanent electric dipole moment of the neutron, a measurement that would test time-reversal symmetry violation beyond the Standard Model. This technique is currently under development at the Oak Ridge Spallation Neutron Source.

=== Tests of fundamental symmetries ===
Using mercury and cesium atomic magnetometers, Lamoreaux and collaborators set stringent limits on possible violations of local Lorentz invariance.

== Selected publications ==
- Golub, R.; Lamoreaux, S. K. (2023). The Historical and Physical Foundations of Quantum Mechanics. Oxford University Press.
- Graham, P. W.; Irastorza, I. G.; Lamoreaux, S. K.; Lindner, A.; van Bibber, K. A. (2015). "Experimental searches for the axion and axion-like particles". Annual Review of Nuclear and Particle Science. 65 (1): 485–514. arXiv:1602.00039. doi:10.1146/annurev-nucl-102014-022120.
- Lamoreaux, S. K. (2005). "The Casimir force: background, experiments, and applications". Reports on Progress in Physics. 68 (1): 201–236. doi:10.1088/0034-4885/68/1/R04.

== Awards and honors ==
- Henderson Prize, University of Washington, 1987 (outstanding dissertation)
- Francis M. Pipkin Award, American Physical Society, 1999 (inaugural recipient)
- Three Los Alamos National Laboratory Distinguished Performance Awards
- Los Alamos Laboratory Fellow
- Honorary M.A., Yale University, 2007
