= Cosmas Zachos =

Greek theoretical physicist

- Κοσμάς Ζάχοs
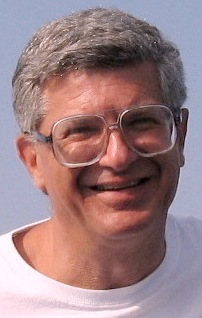
- Born: 1951 (age 74–75); Athens, Greece
- Education: Princeton University; California Institute of Technology
- Scientific career
- Fields: Theoretical physics
- Institutions: Argonne National Laboratory
- Doctoral advisor: John Henry Schwarz

Cosmas K. Zachos (Greek: Κοσμάς Ζάχος; born 1951) is a theoretical physicist. He was educated in physics (undergraduate A.B. 1974) at Princeton University, and did graduate work in theoretical physics at the California Institute of Technology (Ph.D. 1979) under the supervision of John Henry Schwarz.

Zachos is an emeritus staff member in the theory group of the High Energy Physics Division of Argonne National Laboratory. He is considered an authority on the subject of phase-space quantization. His early research involved, jointly, the introduction of renormalization geometrostasis, and the so-called FFZ Lie algebra of noncommutative geometry. His thesis work revealed a balancing repulsive gravitational force present in extended supergravity.

He is co-author of treatises on quantum mechanics in phase space, a Fellow of the American Physical Society, and a Fellow of the Institute of Physics.
