= Ralph Kaufmann =

German mathematician

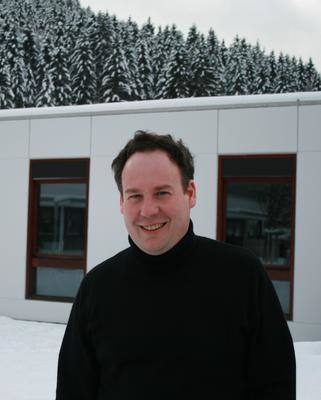
- Kaufmann at Oberwolfach, 2010
- Born: August 4, 1969 (age 57); Bendorf, Rheinland-Pfalz, Germany
- Education: University of Bonn
- Scientific career
- Fields: Mathematics, Physics, Philosophy
- Workplaces: Max Planck Institute for Mathematics, Institut des Hautes Études Scientifiques, Purdue University
- Doctoral advisor: Yuri Manin

Ralph Martin Kaufmann (born August 4, 1969) is a German-American mathematician working in the United States.

== Career ==
Kaufmann studied mathematics, physics and philosophy at the University of Bonn. He obtained a master's degree in Physics in 1994 under the supervision of Werner Nahm and a master's degree in philosophy under the supervision of Rainer Stuhlmann-Laeisz in 1996. His doctoral studies were carried out at the Max Planck Institute for Mathematics under the supervision of Yuri Manin, and he graduated summa cum laude from University of Bonn in 1997 with a thesis entitled "The geometry of the moduli space of pointed curves, the tensor product in the theory of Frobenius manifolds and the explicit Künneth formula in quantum cohomology".

He remained at the Max Planck Institute for one year after his graduation as a researcher before moving to the Institut des Hautes Études Scientifiques for a year with a Marie Curie Fellowship from the European Union.

In 1999 Kaufmann moved to the United States, where he has held several positions. He arrived at his current institution, Purdue University, in 2007 as an associate professor, being promoted to full professor in 2012.

Kaufmann has been a member of the Institute for Advanced Study in Princeton, and has held visiting positions at the Max Planck Institute for Mathematics in Bonn, the Institut des Hautes Études Scientifiques, the Mittag-Leffler Institute in Stockholm, the Isaac Newton Institute in Cambridge, the Mathematical Sciences Research Institute in Berkeley, California and the Hamburg Institute for Advanced Study.

== Research ==
Kaufmann's research has covered different areas of mathematics and theoretical physics. After briefly working on the Virasoro algebra, he started to work on the quantum cohomology of a product and the Künneth formula, obtaining results on explicit formulas and global results. In collaboration with Yuri Manin and Don Zagier he started the study of higher Weil–Peterson volumes, later continued by Losef–Manin and Maryam Mirzakhani. Kaufmann then started to study stringy and mirror phenomena for orbifolds and singularities. This led to the invention of stringy K-theory.

Kaufmann has also worked on string topology, invented by Moira Chas and Dennis Sullivan, and operad theory. Here he first proved a cyclic version of Pierre Deligne's conjecture in deformation theory and provided an extension of string topology to moduli spaces.

More recently Kaufmann has introduced the notion of Feynman categories to give a common framework for various aspects of algebra, geometry, topology, and category theory.

In mathematical physics, he has also studied the geometry of wire networks as well as periodic systems and topological insulators.

In philosophy, he has recently worked on Hegel's theory of mathematics and on Friedrich Hölderlin.

== Honors and awards ==
- Heinrich Hörlein Gedächtnis Preis for his dissertation.
- Simons Fellow

== Publications (books authored) ==
- Kaufmann, Ralph M.; Ward, Benjamin C. (2017). Feynman categories. Paris. ISBN 978-2-85629-852-7. OCLC 990103099.
- Pastior, Oskar; Kaufmann, Ralph; Egger, Oswald (2006). Gewichtete Gedichte : Chronologie der Materialien (in German). Wien-Hombroich: Das böhmische Dorf. ISBN 3-902024-08-9. OCLC 69983395.
