= Michel parameters =

Phase space parameters in leptonic decays

Feynman diagram of the muon decay

The Michel parameters, usually denoted by $\rho, \eta, \xi$ and $\delta$, are four parameters used in describing the phase space distribution of leptonic decays of charged leptons, $l_{i}^-\rightarrow l_{j}^{-}\nu_{i}\bar{\nu_{j}}$. They are named after the physicist Louis Michel. Sometimes instead of $\delta$, the product $\xi\delta$ is quoted. Within the Standard Model of electroweak interactions, these parameters are expected to be

$$\rho={3\over4}, \quad \eta=0, \quad \xi=1, \quad \xi\delta={3\over4}.$$

Precise measurements of energy and angular distributions of the daughter leptons in decays of polarized muons and tau leptons are so far in good agreement with these predictions of the Standard Model.

== Muon decay ==
Consider the decay of the positive muon:

$$\mu^+\to e^+ + \nu_e + \bar\nu_\mu.$$

In the muon rest frame, energy and angular distributions of the positrons emitted in the decay of a polarised muon expressed in terms of Michel parameters are the following, neglecting electron and neutrino masses and the radiative corrections:

$$\frac{d^2\Gamma}{x^2dxd\cos\theta} \sim (3-3x) + \frac{2}{3}\rho (4x-3) + P_{\mu}\xi\cos\theta
[(1-x)+\frac{2}{3}\delta(4x-3)],$$

where $P_{\mu}$ is muon polarisation, $x=E_e/E_e^{max}$, and $\theta$ is the angle between muon spin direction and positron momentum direction. For the decay of the negative muon, the sign of the term containing $\cos\theta$ should be inverted.

For the decay of the positive muon, the expected decay distribution for the Standard Model values of Michel parameters is

$$\frac{d^2\Gamma}{dxd\cos\theta} \sim x^2[(3-2x) - P_{\mu}\cos\theta(1-2x)].$$

Integration of this expression over electron energy gives the angular distribution of the daughter positrons:

$$\frac{d\Gamma}{d\cos\theta} \sim 1 + \frac{1}{3}P_{\mu}\cos\theta.$$

Therefore, positrons are emitted preferentially in the direction of the muon spin. The preference depends on energy and reverses for lower-energy positrons, as can be seen from the above expression for double-differential decay rate. The positron energy distribution integrated over the polar angle is

$$\frac{d\Gamma}{dx} \sim (3x^2-2x^3).$$

In contrast, in the decay of the negatively charged muon, the daughter electrons are emitted preferentially in the direction opposite to that of the muon spin. The asymmetric angular dependence represents evidence for parity violation in weak interactions.
