= Montonen–Olive duality =

Strong-weak duality in supersymmetric theories of theoretical physics

Montonen–Olive duality or electric–magnetic duality is the oldest known example of strong–weak duality (Note: Or weak–strong duality, both terms are correct.) or S-duality according to current terminology. (Note: The term S-duality began being used in the first proposals for extending the strong/weak duality conjecture from the case of supersymmetric four dimensional Yang–Mills theories to the context of superstring theory, first used by Anamaría Font (see Font et al. (1990)). According to Jeffery Harvey the name is a "historical accident": it was introduced, for reasons of practicality, to indicate the discrete symmetry group SL(2, Z) of the ten-dimensional heterotic string theory compactified to four dimensions. More details can be found, for example, in Schwarz (1997), p. 3.) It generalizes the electric–magnetic symmetry of Maxwell's equations by stating that magnetic monopoles, which are usually viewed as emergent quasiparticles that are "composite" (i.e. they are solitons or topological defects), can in fact be viewed as "elementary" quantized particles with electrons playing the reverse role of "composite" topological solitons; the viewpoints are equivalent and the situation dependent on the duality. It was later proven to hold true when dealing with a N = 4 supersymmetric Yang–Mills theory. It is named after Finnish physicist Claus Montonen and British physicist David Olive after they proposed the idea in their academic paper Magnetic monopoles as gauge particles? where they state:

There should be two "dual equivalent" field formulations of the same theory in which electric (Noether) and magnetic (topological) quantum numbers exchange roles.

— Montonen & Olive (1977), p. 117

S-duality is now a basic ingredient in topological quantum field theories and string theories, especially since the 1990s with the advent of the second superstring revolution. This duality is now one of several in string theory, the AdS/CFT correspondence which gives rise to the holographic principle, (Note: The AdS/CFT correspondence, like the Montonen–Olive duality, is also valid in N = 4 supersymmetric Yang–Mills theory and was proposed in 1997 by Juan Maldacena.) being viewed as amongst the most important. These dualities have played an important role in condensed matter physics, from predicting fractional charges of the electron, to the discovery of the magnetic monopole.

== Electric–magnetic duality ==
The idea of a close similarity between electricity and magnetism, going back to the time of André-Marie Ampère and Michael Faraday, was first made more precise with James Clerk Maxwell's formulation of his famous equations for a unified theory of electric and magnetic fields:

$$\begin{align}
\nabla \cdot \mathbf{E} &= \rho \quad & \nabla \times \mathbf{E} + \dot{\mathbf{B}} &= 0 \\
\nabla \cdot \mathbf{B} &= 0 \quad & \nabla \times \mathbf{B} -  \dot{\mathbf{E}} &=  \mathbf{j}.
\end{align}$$

The symmetry between $\mathbf{E}$ and $\mathbf{B}$ in these equations is striking. If one ignores the sources, or adds magnetic sources, the equations are invariant under $\mathbf{E} \rightarrow \mathbf{B}$ and $\mathbf{B} \rightarrow - \mathbf{E}$.

Why should there be such symmetry between $\mathbf{E}$ and $\mathbf{B}$? In 1931 Paul Dirac was studying the quantum mechanics of an electric charge moving in a magnetic monopole field, and he found he could only consistently define the wavefunction if the electric charge $e$ and magnetic charge $q$ satisfy the quantization condition:

$$\begin{align}
eq=2\pi\hbar n \quad  \quad  & n = 0, \pm1, \pm2 ... \\
\end{align}$$

Note that from the above if just one monopole of some charge $q$ exists anywhere, then all electric charges must be multiples of the unit $2\pi\hbar/q$. This would "explain" why the magnitude of the electron charge and proton charge should be exactly equal and are the same no matter what electron or proton we are considering, (Note: Dirac (1931) treated the case of an electrically charged particle moving in a fixed magnetic monopole field. Dirac (1948) is a more general analysis of the relativistic classical and quantum dynamics of a system of moving and interacting magnetic monopoles and electric charges.) a fact known to hold true to one part in 10^{21}. This led Dirac to state:

The interest of the theory of magnetic poles is that it forms a natural generalization of the usual electrodynamics and it leads to the quantization of electricity. [...] The quantization of electricity is one of the most fundamental and striking features of atomic physics, and there seems to be no explanation for it apart from the theory of poles. This provides some grounds for believing in the existence of these poles.

— Dirac (1948), p. 817

The magnetic monopole line of research took a step forward in 1974 when Gerard 't Hooft and Alexander Markovich Polyakov independently constructed monopoles not as quantized point particles, but as solitons, in a $\operatorname{SU}(2)$ Yang–Mills–Higgs system, previously magnetic monopoles had always included a point singularity. The subject was motivated by Nielsen–Olesen vortices.

At weak coupling, the electrically and magnetically charged objects look very different: one an electron point particle that is weakly coupled and the other a monopole soliton that is strongly coupled. The magnetic fine structure constant is roughly the reciprocal of the usual one: $\alpha_\text{m}q^{2}/4\pi\hbar=n^{2}/4\alpha$.

In 1977 Claus Montonen and David Olive conjectured that at strong coupling the situation would be reversed: the electrically charged objects would be strongly coupled and have non-singular cores, while the magnetically charged objects would become weakly coupled and point like. The strongly coupled theory would be equivalent to weakly coupled theory in which the basic quanta carried magnetic rather than electric charges. In subsequent work this conjecture was refined by Ed Witten and David Olive, they showed that in a supersymmetric extension of the Georgi–Glashow model, the $N = 2$ supersymmetric version (N is the number of conserved supersymmetries), there were no quantum corrections to the classical mass spectrum and the calculation of the exact masses could be obtained. The problem related to the monopole's unit spin remained for this $N = 2$ case, but soon after a solution to it was obtained for the case of $N = 4$ supersymmetry: Hugh Osborn was able to show that when spontaneous symmetry breaking is imposed in the N = 4 supersymmetric gauge theory, the spins of the topological monopole states are identical to those of the massive gauge particles.

== Dual gravity ==
In 1979–1980, Montonen–Olive duality motivated developing mixed symmetric higher-spin Curtright field. For the spin-2 case, the gauge-transformation dynamics of Curtright field is dual to graviton in D>4 spacetime. Meanwhile, the spin-0 field, developed by Curtright–Freund, is dual to the Freund–Nambu field, that is coupled to the trace of its energy–momentum tensor.

The massless linearized dual gravity was theoretically realized in 2000s for wide class of higher-spin gauge fields, especially that is related to $\mathrm{SO}(8)$, $E_7$ and $E_{11}$ supergravity.

A massive spin-2 dual gravity, to lowest order, in D = 4 and N − D is recently introduced as a theory dual to the massive gravity of Ogievetsky–Polubarinov theory. The dual field is coupled to the curl of the energy momentum tensor.

== Mathematical formalism ==
In a four-dimensional Yang–Mills theory with N = 4 supersymmetry, which is the case where the Montonen–Olive duality applies, one obtains a physically equivalent theory if one replaces the gauge coupling constant g by 1/g. This also involves an interchange of the electrically charged particles and magnetic monopoles. See also Seiberg duality.

In fact, there exists a larger SL(2, Z) symmetry where both g as well as theta-angle are transformed non-trivially.

The gauge coupling and theta-angle can be combined to form one complex coupling

$$\tau = \frac{\theta}{2\pi}+\frac{4\pi i}{g^2}.$$

Since the theta-angle is periodic, there is a symmetry

$$\tau \mapsto \tau + 1.$$

The quantum mechanical theory with gauge group G (but not the classical theory, except in the case when the G is abelian) is also invariant under the symmetry

$$\tau \mapsto \frac{-1}{n_G\tau}$$

while the gauge group G is simultaneously replaced by its Langlands dual group ^{L}G and $n_G$ is an integer depending on the choice of gauge group. In the case the theta-angle is 0, this reduces to the simple form of Montonen–Olive duality stated above.

== Philosophical implications ==
The Montonen–Olive duality throws into question the idea that we can obtain a full theory of physics by reducing things into their "fundamental" parts. The philosophy of reductionism states that if we understand the "fundamental" or "elementary" parts of a system we can then deduce all the properties of the system as a whole. Duality says that there is no physically measurable property that can deduce what is fundamental and what is not, the notion of what is elementary and what is composite is merely relative, acting as a kind of gauge symmetry. (Note: See for example Rickles (2015) and Castellani (2016).) This seems to favour the view of emergentism, as both the Noether charge (particle) and topological charge (soliton) have the same ontology. Several notable physicists underlined the implications of duality:

Under a duality map, often an elementary particle in one string theory gets mapped to a composite particle in a dual string theory and vice versa. Thus classification of particles into elementary and composite loses significance as it depends on which particular theory we use to describe the system.

— Sen (2001), p. 3

I could go on and on, taking you on a tour of the space of string theories, and show you how everything is mutable, nothing being more elementary than anything else. Personally, I would bet that this kind of anti-reductionist behaviour is true in any consistent synthesis of quantum mechanics and gravity.

— Susskind (2011), p. 178

The first conclusion is that Dirac's explanation of charge quantisation is triumphantly vindicated. At first sight it seemed as if the idea of unification provided an alternative explanation, avoiding monopoles, but this was illusory as magnetic monopoles were indeed lurking hidden in the theory, disguised as solitons. This raises an important conceptual point. The magnetic monopole here has been treated as bona fide particle even though it arose as a soliton, namely as a solution to the classical equations of motion. It therefore appears to have a different status from the "Planckian particles" considered hitherto and discussed at the beginning of the lecture. These arose as quantum excitations of the original fields of the initial formulation of the theory, products of the quantisation procedures applied to these dynamical variables (fields).

— Olive (2001), p. 5
