= Louis Michel (physicist) =

French physicist (1923–1999)

Louis Michel (French pronunciation: [lwi miʃɛl]; 1923–1999) was a French mathematical physicist at the Institut des Hautes Études Scientifiques (IHÉS). He was born in Roanne, in the Loire department in central France, on 4 May 1923, and died in Bures-sur-Yvette (Essonne), in the Île-de-France region, on 30 December 1999. His name is associated with Michel parameters describing the phase space distribution of leptonic decays of charged leptons, the Bargmann–Michel–Telegdi equation describing spin evolution in a magnetic field, and the Michel–Radicati theory for the SU(3) octet,

== Biography ==
Michel completed his studies at the École Polytechnique in Paris. After World War II, he went to Manchester, England, where he worked on weak interactions. Back in France, he was teaching in Lille and Orsay before creating the Centre de Physique Théorique of the École Polytechnique (CPHT) in Palaiseau. In 1953 he introduced the concept of G parity.

In 1962, he became a permanent professor at Institut des Hautes Études Scientifiques (IHÉS) in Bures-sur-Yvette, where he remained until his retirement, and as an emeritus professor until his death.

Louis Michel was President of the Société Française de Physique between 1978 and 1980, and a member of the French Academy of Sciences since 1979. In 1982, he was awarded the Wigner Medal.

His scientific activities in the domain of theoretical physics encompassed many fields, from elementary particles and high energy physics to crystals, and provided pioneering insights in spontaneous symmetry breaking in many contexts. Including a theory of phase transitions as a symmetry-breaking, his geometric theory of spontaneous symmetry breaking, and to several results in crystallography.

He supervised Claude Bouchiat on the first calculations on the influence of hadron pairs on the anomalous magnetic moment of the muon.

In 2000, in honor of his memory, the IHÉS created the chaire Louis Michel de physique théorique, an academic chair for distinguished long-term visitors.
