= David Olive =

British theoretical physicist (1937–2012)

David Olive CBE FRS FLSW
- Born: David Ian Olive; 16 April 1937; Middlesex, England
- Died: 7 November 2012 (aged 75); Cambridge, England
- Education: University of Edinburgh (BA, 1958); St John's College, Cambridge (PhD, 1963)
- Known for: GKO construction; GSO projection; Montonen–Olive duality
- Spouse: Jenny Olive (m. 1963)
- Awards: Dirac Medal
- Scientific career
- Fields: Theoretical physics
- Workplaces: University of Cambridge; Carnegie Institute of Technology; CERN; Imperial College London; University of Swansea
- Thesis: Unitarity and S-matrix theory (1963)
- Doctoral advisor: John Clayton Taylor
- Doctoral students: Neil Turok; Ed Corrigan; Andrew Crumey

David Ian Olive CBE FRS FLSW (/ˈɒlɪv/; 16 April 1937 – 7 November 2012) was a British theoretical physicist. Olive made fundamental contributions to string theory and duality theory, he is particularly known for his work on the GSO projection and Montonen–Olive duality.

He was professor of physics at Imperial College, London, from 1984 to 1992. In 1992 he moved to Swansea University to help set up the new theoretical physics group.

He was awarded the Dirac Prize and Medal of the International Centre for Theoretical Physics in 1997. He was a Founding Fellow of the Learned Society of Wales. He was elected as a fellow of the Royal Society in 1987, and appointed CBE in 2002.

== Biography ==
=== Early life and education ===
David Olive was born in Middlesex in 1937 and educated at the Royal High School, Edinburgh and Edinburgh University. He then moved to St John's College, Cambridge, obtaining his PhD under the supervision of John Taylor in 1963.

He married Jenny in 1963; they had 2 daughters and a granddaughter.

=== Career ===
After a short postdoctoral appointment at the Carnegie Institute in Pittsburgh, Olive returned to Cambridge as a Fellow of Churchill College, becoming a lecturer in the Department of Applied Mathematics and Theoretical Physics (DAMTP) in 1965. Here he made key contributions to the approach to particle physics known as S-matrix theory. His 1966 book The Analytic S-matrix co-authored with Richard Eden, Peter Landshoff and John Polkinghorne, remains a definitive text on the subject and is known as ELOP.

In 1971, Olive made what he has described as a "momentous personal decision" to sacrifice his tenured position in Cambridge and move to the Theory Division, CERN as a fixed-term staff member. He was part of a team assembled by Daniele Amati to work on the theory originally known as the dual resonance model but shortly to be recognised as string theory. In CERN, Olive began the collaborations with the circle of string theorists many of whom feature in his memoir From Dual Fermion to Superstring. His work at CERN, in part in collaboration with Lars Brink and Ed Corrigan, initially focused on the consistent formulation of dual fermion amplitudes, generalising the existing bosonic models. This period saw several of Olive's major contributions to string theory, including the Gliozzi-Scherk-Olive (GSO) projection which elucidated the role of spacetime supersymmetry in ensuring consistency of the dual fermion model and was to prove an essential step in establishing 10-dimensional superstring theory. He was one of the first to become convinced of the conceptual revolution whereby string theory is viewed as a unified theory of all particle interactions, including gravity, rather than simply as a model of hadrons. This was the subject of his plenary talk at the 1974 Rochester conference in London.

In 1977, Olive returned to the UK to take up a lectureship at Imperial College, becoming Professor in 1984 and Head of the Theoretical Physics Group in 1988. He had by now begun collaboration with Peter Goddard and together they produced a series of papers on the mathematical foundations of string theory, notably on Virasoro and Kac-Moody algebras and their representations and relation to vertex operators. One outcome of their work on algebras and lattices was the identification of the special role played by the two Lie groups SO(32) and E8 x E8, which would shortly be shown by Michael Green and John Schwarz to exhibit anomaly cancellation that led to the renaissance of string theory in 1984.

This body of work from 1973 to 1983 was recognised with the award of the prestigious Dirac Medal in 1997 to Goddard and Olive "in recognition of their far-sighted and highly influential contributions to theoretical physics. They have contributed many crucial insights that shaped our emerging understanding of string theory and have also had a far-reaching impact on our understanding of 4-dimensional field theory.” The Dirac Medal also recognised a second major line of research pioneered by Olive, on duality symmetries in gauge field theories, this work was to play a key role in later developments of M-theory. While still at CERN, Olive had begun to study the magnetic monopoles which 't Hooft and Polyakov had shown existed in non-abelian gauge theories, publishing a paper with Peter Goddard and Jean Nuyts. In 1977, together with Claus Montonen, he made the remarkable conjecture that there should exist an electromagnetic dual theory in which the roles of monopoles and gauge bosons are interchanged. In subsequent work with Ed Witten, Olive showed that this duality is realised in a certain class of supersymmetric theories. This Montonen-Olive duality was later found to emerge from a deeper web of dualities underlying M-theory, ushering in the second superstring revolution of the mid-1990s.

In 1992, Olive left Imperial to take up a research professorship in mathematics and physics at Swansea University, where together with Ian Halliday he built the theoretical particle physics group. He continued to work on mathematical physics, exploring the deep symmetries underlying quantum field theories, especially affine Toda theory. His retirement was marked by a conference "Strings, Gauge Fields and Duality" held in his honour in Swansea in 2004. He presented the Dirac Lecture at DAMTP on 14 June 2004 titled The Eternal Magnetic Monopole.

== Selected publications ==
=== Books ===
- Eden, R. J.; Landshoff, P. V.; Olive, D. I.; Polkinghorne, J. C. (1966). The Analytic S-Matrix (2002 ed.). Cambridge: Cambridge University Press. ISBN 0-521-04869-9. LCCN 66013387. OCLC 49737553.
- Olive, D.; West, P. C. (8 July 1999). Duality and Supersymmetric Theories. Cambridge: Cambridge University Press. ISBN 0-521-64158-6. LCCN 99018753. OCLC 40762790.
- Olive, D. (12 April 2012). "From Dual Fermion to Superstring". In Cappelli, Andrea; Castellani, Elena; Colomo, Filippo; Di Vecchia, Paolo (eds.). The Birth of String Theory. Cambridge University Press. ISBN 978-0-521-19790-8. LCCN 2011052388. OCLC 939628805.
- Pais, A.; Jacob, M.; Olive, D. I.; Atiyah, M. F. (1998). Goddard, P. (ed.). Paul Dirac: The Man and His Work. Cambridge: Cambridge University Press. ISBN 0-521-58382-9. LCCN 97022443. OCLC 833170188.

=== Academic papers ===
- Goddard, P.; Nuyts, J.; Olive, D. (1977). "Gauge theories and magnetic charge" (PDF). Nuclear Physics B. 125 (1): 1–28. Bibcode:1977NuPhB.125....1G. doi:10.1016/0550-3213(77)90221-8. ISSN 0550-3213.
- Gliozzi, F.; Scherk, J.; Olive, D. (1977). "Supersymmetry, supergravity theories and the dual spinor model" (PDF). Nuclear Physics B. 122 (2): 253–290. Bibcode:1977NuPhB.122..253G. doi:10.1016/0550-3213(77)90206-1. ISSN 0550-3213.
- Montonen, C.; Olive, D. (1977). "Magnetic monopoles as gauge particles?" (PDF). Physics Letters B. 72 (1): 117–120. Bibcode:1977PhLB...72..117M. doi:10.1016/0370-2693(77)90076-4. ISSN 0370-2693.
- Witten, E.; Olive, D. (1978). "Supersymmetry algebras that include topological charges". Physics Letters B. 78 (1): 97–101. Bibcode:1978PhLB...78...97W. doi:10.1016/0370-2693(78)90357-X. ISSN 0370-2693.

== See also ==
- GSO projection
- Montonen–Olive duality
- M-theory
- Supersymmetry
- String theory
