= Vincent Bouchiat =

French condensed matter physicist (born 1970)

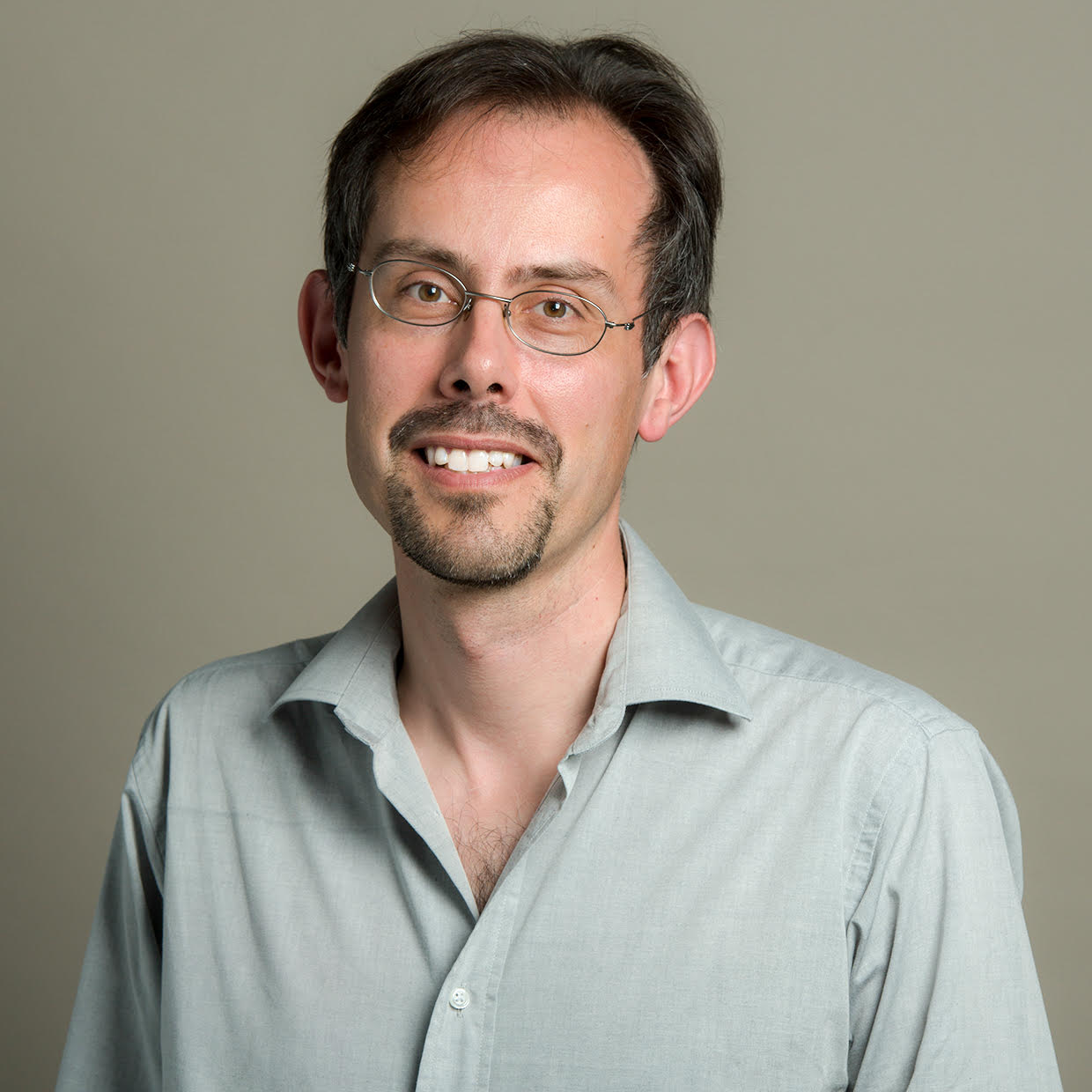
- Born: 1970 (age 55–56)
- Education: Lycée Henri IV; ESPCI Paris (Dipl. Ing.); Université Pierre et Marie Curie (M2); CEA Saclay (PhD)
- Parents: Claude Bouchiat (father); Marie-Anne Bouchiat (mother)
- Relatives: Hélène Bouchiat (sister)
- Awards: Miller Visiting Professorship award (2007), Lee-Hsun Research Award (2017), Yves Rocard Prize (2023)
- Scientific career
- Fields: Condensed matter physics, graphene, biotechnology
- Thesis: Quantum fluctuations of the charge in single electron and single Cooper pair devices (1997)
- Doctoral advisor: Michel Devoret
- Website: Profile on Institut Néel

Vincent Bouchiat (French pronunciation: [vɛ̃sɑ̃ buʃja]; born 1970) is a French condensed matter physicist and entrepreneur. He was a CNRS research director from 1997 to 2019. In 2019 he co-founded the company Grapheal SAS, of which he is currently CEO.

== Early life and education ==
Bouchiat was born to Claude Bouchiat and Marie-Anne Bouchiat, both of whom were physicists.

Vincent Bouchiat followed his studies in Paris partially at the Lycée Henri-IV. In 1993, he received an engineer degree from the School of Industrial Physics and Chemistry of Paris ESPCI in 1993 and a master's degree in solid state physics from the University of Paris, Pierre & Marie Curie. After completing his Ph.D. at Quantronics group in CEA-Saclay in 1997 under the supervision of Michel Devoret and Daniel Esteve.

== Career ==
=== Directeur de recherche ===
Bouchiat became a director of research at the French National Centre for Scientific Research (CNRS) in 1997. He was affiliated with the Institut Néel in Grenoble from 2012. Bouchiat also became invited professor in 2007 at the Physics department of University of California, Berkeley.

=== Grapheal SAS ===
In 2019, Bouchiat co-founded the company Grapheal SAS, where he is currently CEO. It is a startup focusing on the healthcare applications of graphene.

== Research ==
Bouchiat's PhD thesis is recognized as a pioneering study in the field of quantum computing hardware, showing the quantum superposition of charge states in a single Cooper pair box. This experiment paved the way for the realisation of a charge qubit.

Bouchiat's research interests cover a wide range of solid state physics and multidisciplinary investigations which include quantum information, superconductivity, carbon nanostructures (graphene and carbon nanotubes), bioelectronics and translational research research in medical sciences .

== Awards ==
Bouchiat has won the following awards:

- Visiting Miller Professorship Award (2007) from Miller Institute at University of California, Berkeley
- Lee-Hsun Research Award (2017) from the Chinese Academy of Sciences (Institute of Metal Research)
- Yves Rocard Prize (2023) from the French Physical Society

== Personal life ==
Vincent has a sister, Hélène Bouchiat, who is also a physicist.
