= Spectral asymmetry =

In mathematics and physics, the spectral asymmetry is the asymmetry in the distribution of the spectrum of eigenvalues of an operator. In mathematics, the spectral asymmetry arises in the study of elliptic operators on compact manifolds, and is given a deep meaning by the Atiyah-Patodi-Singer index theorem. In physics, it has numerous applications, typically resulting in a fractional charge due to the asymmetry of the spectrum of a Dirac operator. For example, the vacuum expectation value of the baryon number is given by the spectral asymmetry of the Hamiltonian operator. The spectral asymmetry of the confined quark fields is an important property of the chiral bag model. For fermions, it is known as the Witten index, and can be understood as describing the Casimir effect for fermions.

== Definition ==
Given an operator with eigenvalues $\omega_n$, an equal number of which are positive and negative, the spectral asymmetry may be defined as the sum

$$B=\lim_{t\to 0} \frac{1}{2}\sum_n \sgn(\omega_n) \exp (-t|\omega_n|)$$

where $\sgn(x)$ is the sign function. Other regulators, such as the zeta function regulator, may be used.

The need for both a positive and negative spectrum in the definition is why the spectral asymmetry usually occurs in the study of Dirac operators.

== Example ==
As an example, consider an operator with a spectrum

$$\omega_n=n+\alpha$$

where n is an integer, ranging over all positive and negative values. One may show in a straightforward manner that in this case $B(\alpha)$ obeys $B(\alpha)= B(\alpha +m)$ for any integer $m$, and that for $0<\alpha<1$ we have $B(\alpha)=1/2-\alpha$. The graph of $B(\alpha)$ is therefore a periodic sawtooth curve.

== Discussion ==
Related to the spectral asymmetry is the vacuum expectation value of the energy associated with the operator, the Casimir energy, which is given by

$$E=\lim_{t\to 0} \frac{1}{2}\sum_n |\omega_n| \exp (-t|\omega_n|)$$

This sum is formally divergent, and the divergences must be accounted for and removed using standard regularization techniques.
