= Marie-Anne Bouchiat =

French physicist (born 1934)

Marie-Anne Bouchiat (née Guiochon; born 1934) is a French experimental atomic physicist whose research has included studies of neutral currents, parity violation, and hyperpolarization. She is an honorary director of research for the French National Centre for Scientific Research (CNRS).

== Education and career ==
Bouchiat was a student at the École normale supérieure de jeunes filles from 1953 to 1957, and a visiting researcher at Princeton University from 1957 to 1959. She completed a doctorate in 1964; her dissertation was Étude par pompage optique de la relaxation d'atomes de rubidium. She worked as a researcher for CNRS from 1972, associated with the Kastler–Brossel Laboratory, until her retirement in 2005.

== Personal life ==
Bouchiat married physicist Claude Bouchiat. Their daughter Hélène Bouchiat is a physicist. They have a son, Vincent Bouchiat who is a physicist.

== Recognition ==
Bouchiat was elected as a corresponding member of the French Academy of Sciences in 1986, and a full member in 1988. She became a member of Academia Europaea in 1993.

She won the CNRS bronze and silver medals in 1966 and 1971 respectively. The French Academy of Sciences gave her their Hughes Prize in 1968, and the Ampère Prize in 1983.

She is a knight in the Ordre des Palmes académiques, a commander in the Ordre national du Mérite, and a commander in the Legion of Honour.
