= Claude Bouchiat =

French physicist (1932–2021)

- Born: 16 May 1932
- Died: 25 November 2021 (aged 89)
- Spouse: Marie-Anne Bouchiat
- Children: Hélène Bouchiat (daughter), Geneviève Bouchiat (daughter), Vincent Bouchiat (son)
- Scientific career
- Thesis: La règle de sélection ΔT=0 dans les transitions de Fermi et la théorie de l'interaction vectorielle en radioactivité β (1960)
- Doctoral students: Joël Scherk, André Neveu

Claude Bouchiat (French pronunciation: [klod buʃja]; 16 May 1932 – 25 November 2021) was a French physicist, and a member of the French Academy of Sciences.

== Biography ==
Graduate of the École Polytechnique in 1955. He completed a Ph.D. in 1960 titled La règle de sélection ΔT=0 dans les transitions de Fermi et la théorie de l'interaction vectorielle en radioactivité β.

Bouchiat was director of research at the CNRS in the theoretical physics laboratory of the École Normale Supérieure from 1971 to 2003. Claude was the disciple of Louis Michel and worked with him on the anomalous magnetic dipole moment of the muon.

Bouchiat became an honorary research director in 2003.

Philippe Meyer and Bouchiat supervised the doctorates of Joël Scherk and André Neveu at University of Paris XI in Orsay.

=== Personal life ===
Bouchiat married Marie-Anne Bouchiat who is also a physicist. Their daughter Hélène Bouchiat and son Vincent Bouchiat are both condensed matter physicists.

Bouchiat died on 22 November 2021, at the age of 89.

== Distinctions ==
- 1980: Elected correspondent of the French Academy of Sciences in the Physics section
- 1983: Prix Ampère de l’Électricité de France by the French Academy of sciences
- 1990: Three Physicists Prize by the École normale supérieure de Paris
