= Scherk–Schwarz mechanism =

In theoretical physics, the Scherk–Schwarz mechanism (named after Joël Scherk and John Henry Schwarz) for a field φ basically means that φ is a section of a non-trivializable fiber bundle (not necessarily a vector bundle since φ needn't be linear) which is fixed by the model. This is called a twist by physicists.

Note that this can never occur in a spacetime which is homeomorphic to R^{n}, which is a contractible space. However, for Kaluza–Klein theories, the Scherk–Schwarz mechanism is a possibility which can't be neglected.
