= Michael Green (physicist) =

British physicist (born 1946)

Michael Green FRS HonFInstP
- Born: Michael Boris Green; 22 May 1946 (age 80); London
- Education: Churchill College, Cambridge
- Known for: Lorentz-covariant description of superstrings Classification of the consistent ten-dimensional superstring theories Green–Schwarz mechanism GS formalism Type II string theory
- Spouse: Joanna Chataway
- Awards: Maxwell Medal and Prize (1987); Dirac Medal (ICTP) (1989); Dannie Heineman Prize for Mathematical Physics (2002); Dirac Medal (IOP) (2004); Naylor Prize and Lectureship (2007); Breakthrough Prize in Fundamental Physics (2013)
- Scientific career
- Fields: Theoretical Physics
- Workplaces: University of Cambridge; Queen Mary College, University of London; Princeton University; University of Oxford
- Thesis: Crossing Symmetry And Duality in Strong Interactions (1970)
- Doctoral advisor: Richard J. Eden
- Doctoral students: Aninda Sinha
- Website: www.damtp.cam.ac.uk/user/mbg15 www.damtp.cam.ac.uk/people/m.b.green

Michael Boris Green FRS HonFInstP (born 22 May 1946) is a British physicist and a pioneer of string theory. He is a professor of theoretical physics in the School of Physics and Astronomy at Queen Mary University of London, emeritus professor in the Department of Applied Mathematics and Theoretical Physics and a fellow of Clare Hall, Cambridge. He was the Lucasian professor of mathematics from 2009 to 2015.

== Early life and education ==
Green was born the son of Genia Green and Absalom Green. He attended William Ellis School in London and Churchill College, Cambridge where he graduated with a Bachelor of Arts with first class honours in theoretical physics (1967) and a PhD in elementary particle theory (1970).

== Career ==
Following his PhD, Green did postdoctoral research at Princeton University (1970–72), Cambridge and the University of Oxford. Between 1978 and 1993 he was a Lecturer and Professor at Queen Mary College, University of London, and in July 1993 he was appointed John Humphrey Plummer Professor of Theoretical Physics at the University of Cambridge. On 19 October 2009 he was confirmed as the next Lucasian Professor of Mathematics, to succeed Stephen Hawking on 1 November 2009. In 2015 he was succeeded in that chair by Michael Cates, a specialist in colloids, gels, and particulate materials.

== Research ==
After many years in collaboration with John Henry Schwarz, he co-discovered type II string theory in 1982, and later the anomaly cancellation in type I string theory in 1984. This latter insight, named the Green–Schwarz mechanism, initiated the First Superstring Revolution. Green has also worked on Dirichlet boundary conditions in string theory which have led to the postulation of D-branes and instantons.

== Awards and honours ==
Green has been awarded the Paul Dirac and Maxwell Medals of the Institute of Physics, UK, the Dirac Medal of the International Centre for Theoretical Physics (Trieste) and the Dannie Heineman Prize for Mathematical Physics of the American Physical Society. He was elected a Fellow of the Royal Society in 1989. Green has co-authored more than 150 research papers.

His nomination for the Royal Society reads

Distinguished for his outstanding contributions to quantum field theory, especially the theory of superstrings. Green's early work was largely on duality in S-matrix theory. He was the first to prove an important result on the dual model – the cancellation of the leading divergences between boson and fermion loops. He has made significant contributions to the theory of phase transitions, but is best known for his trail-blazing work, much of it in collaboration with Schwarz, on superstring theory, including the first covariant formulation of the theory. The most important results are the proofs in 1984 and 1985 of anomaly cancellation for SO (32) and E8xE8 superstring theories and of infinity cancellation in the SO (32) case. These definitive papers initiated the explosive growth of superstring theory, now one of the most active and exciting areas of fundamental theoretical physics.

On 12 December 2013, Michael Green shared the Breakthrough Prize in Fundamental Physics with John Henry Schwarz "for opening new perspectives on quantum gravity and the unification of forces".

== Selected publications ==
- Green, M., John H. Schwarz, and E. Witten. Superstring Theory. Vol. 1, Introduction. Cambridge Monographs on Mathematical Physics. Cambridge, UK: Cambridge University Press, 1988. ISBN 9780521357524.
- Superstring Theory. Vol. 2, Loop Amplitudes, Anomalies and Phenomenology. Cambridge, UK: Cambridge University Press, 1988. ISBN 9780521357531.
