= John Henry Schwarz =

American theoretical physicist

- Born: November 22, 1941 (age 84); North Adams, Massachusetts, U.S.
- Education: Harvard University (BA); University of California, Berkeley (PhD)
- Known for: Lorentz-covariant description of superstrings Classification of the consistent ten-dimensional superstring theories Green–Schwarz mechanism RNS formalism GS formalism Neveu–Schwarz algebra Neveu–Schwarz B-field; Scherk–Schwarz mechanism Discovering the D = 10 critical dimension of superstring theory Type II string theory Type IIB supergravity
- Scientific career
- Fields: Theoretical physics
- Workplaces: Princeton University; California Institute of Technology
- Doctoral advisor: Geoffrey Chew
- Doctoral students: Mina Aganagic; Anthony Ichiro Sanda; Cosmas Zachos; Augusto Sagnotti; Michael R. Douglas; Gerald B. Cleaver

John Henry Schwarz (Born November 22, 1941) is an American theoretical physicist. Along with Yoichiro Nambu, Holger Bech Nielsen, Joël Scherk, Gabriele Veneziano, Michael Green, and Leonard Susskind, he is regarded as one of the founders of string theory.

== Early life and education ==
He studied mathematics at Harvard College (A.B., 1962) and theoretical physics at the University of California at Berkeley (Ph.D., 1966), where his graduate advisor was Geoffrey Chew. For several years he was one of the very few physicists who pursued string theory as a viable theory of quantum gravity.

His work with Michael Green on anomaly cancellation in Type I string theories led to the so-called "first superstring revolution" of 1984, which greatly contributed to moving string theory into the mainstream of research in theoretical physics.

Schwarz was an assistant professor at Princeton University from 1966 to 1972. He then moved to the California Institute of Technology (Caltech), where he is currently the Harold Brown Professor of Theoretical Physics.

== Awards ==
He was elected a member of the National Academy of Sciences and a Fellow of the American Physical Society (1986). He was a fellow of the MacArthur Foundation in 1987.

He received the Dirac Medal of the International Centre for Theoretical Physics in 1989, and the Dannie Heineman Prize for Mathematical Physics of the American Physical Society in 2002. On December 12, 2013, he shared the Breakthrough Prize in Fundamental Physics with Michael Green "for opening new perspectives on quantum gravity and the unification of forces."

== Selected publications ==
- Green, M., John H. Schwarz, and E. Witten. Superstring Theory. Vol. 1, Introduction. Cambridge Monographs on Mathematical Physics. Cambridge, UK: Cambridge University Press, 1988. ISBN 9780521357524.
- Superstring Theory. Vol. 2, Loop Amplitutes, Anomalies and Phenomenology. Cambridge, UK: Cambridge University Press, 1988. ISBN 9780521357531.
- Becker, Katrin, Melanie Becker, and John H. Schwarz. String theory and M-theory: A modern introduction. Cambridge University Press, 2006. ISBN 978-0-521-86069-7.
