= Hélène Bouchiat =

French physicist (born 1958)

- Born: 1958 (age 67–68)
- Education: Université Paris-Sud (PhD)
- Parents: Claude Bouchiat (father); Marie-Anne Bouchiat (mother)
- Relatives: Vincent Bouchiat (brother)
- Scientific career
- Fields: Condensed matter physics, nanoscience, others
- Workplaces: Laboratoire de Physique des Solides
- Thesis: Transition verre de spin : comportement critique et bruit magnétique, was supervised (1986)
- Doctoral advisor: Philippe Monod
- Website: Profile on LPS

Hélène Bouchiat (French pronunciation: [elɛn buʃja]; born 1958) is a French condensed matter physicist specializing in mesoscopic physics and nanoscience. She is a director of research in the French National Centre for Scientific Research (CNRS), associated with the Laboratoire de Physique des Solides at Paris-Sud University. Topics in her research include supercurrents, persistent currents, graphene, carbon nanotubes, and bismuth-based topological insulators.

== Early life and education ==
Bouchiat is the daughter of physicists Marie-Anne (née Guiochon) and Claude Bouchiat.

She was a student at the École normale supérieure. Her 1986 doctoral dissertation, Transition verre de spin : comportement critique et bruit magnétique, was supervised by Philippe Monod at Paris-Sud University.

== Career ==
With the exception of an 18-month postdoctoral research visit at Bell Labs, Bouchiat has spent her entire career with the CNRS.

== Honors and awards ==
Bouchiat is a member of the French Academy of Sciences, elected in 2010. The academy also gave her their Anatole and Suzanne Abragam Prize in 1994, and their Jaffé Prize in 1998. She won the CNRS bronze and silver medals in 1987 and 2007 respectively.

== Personal life ==
Bouchiat has a brother, Vincent Bouchiat who is also a physicist.
