= Witten index =

Modified partition function

In quantum field theory and statistical mechanics, the Witten index at the inverse temperature β is defined as a modification of the standard partition function:

$$\textrm{Tr}[(-1)^F e^{-\beta H}]$$

Note the (-1)^{F} operator, where F is the fermion number operator. This is what makes it different from the ordinary partition function. It is sometimes referred to as the spectral asymmetry.

In a supersymmetric theory, each nonzero energy eigenvalue contains an equal number of bosonic and fermionic states. Because of this, the Witten index is independent of the temperature and gives the number of zero energy bosonic vacuum states minus the number of zero energy fermionic vacuum states. In particular, if supersymmetry is spontaneously broken then there are no zero energy ground states and so the Witten index is equal to zero.

The Witten index of the supersymmetric sigma model on a manifold is given by the manifold's Euler characteristic.

$$\textrm{Tr}[(-1)^F e^{-\beta H}]=\sum_{p\in\mathbb{Z}}(-1)^pb_p=\chi(M) \ .$$

It is an example of a quasi-topological quantity, which is a quantity that depends only on F-terms and not on D-terms in the Lagrangian. A more refined invariant in 2-dimensional theories, constructed using only the right-moving part of the fermion number operator together with a 2-parameter family of variations, is the elliptic genus.

== See also ==
- Supersymmetric theory of stochastic dynamics
- Topological order
