= Bernard Julia =

French theoretical physicist (born 1952)

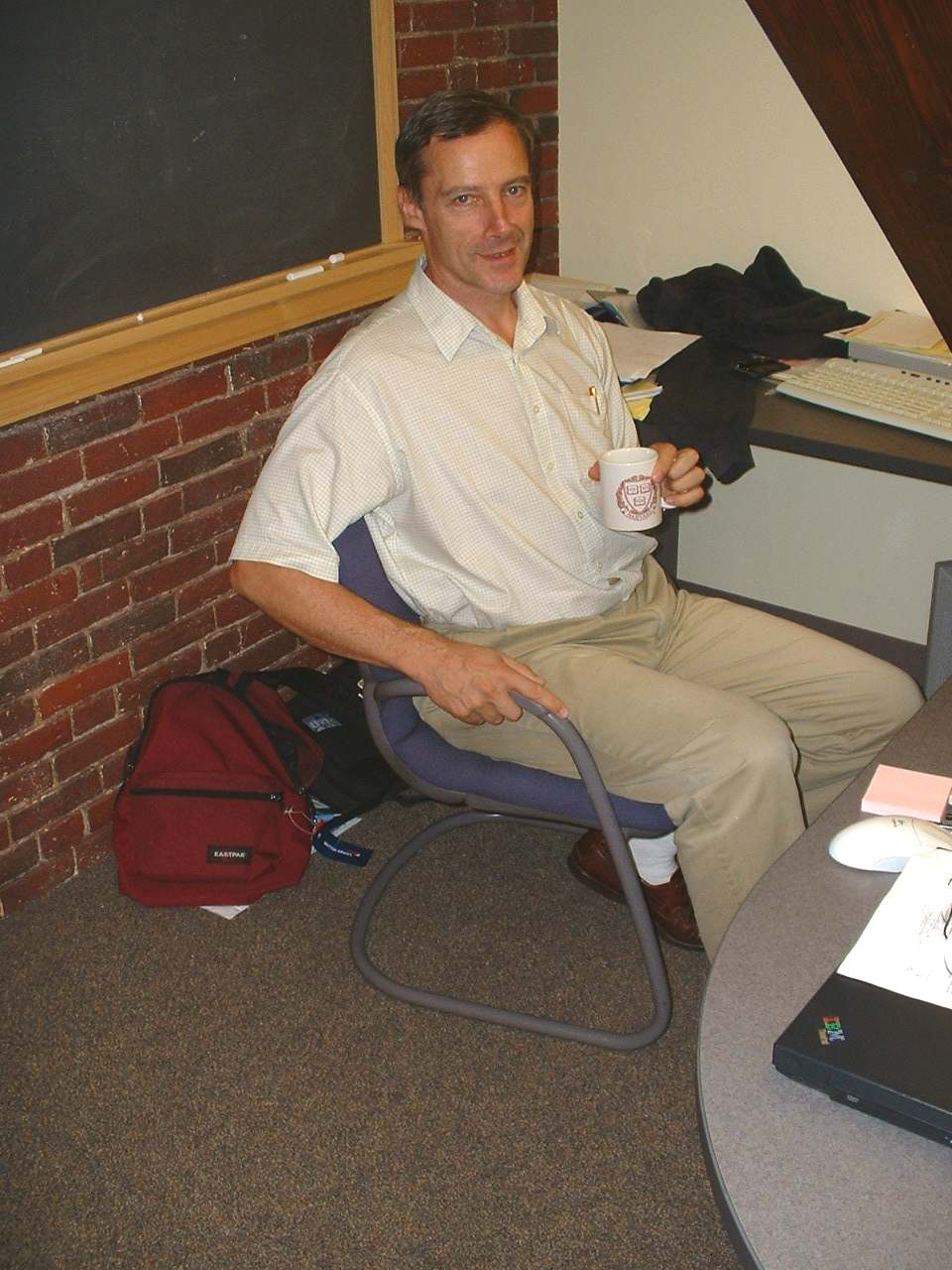
Bernard Julia at Harvard University

Bernard Julia (born 1952 in Paris) is a French theoretical physicist who has made contributions to the theory of supergravity. He graduated from Université Paris-Sud in 1978, and is directeur de recherche with the CNRS working at the École Normale Supérieure. In 1978, together with Eugène Cremmer and Joël Scherk, he constructed eleven-dimensional supergravity. Shortly afterwards, Cremmer and Julia constructed the classical Lagrangian for four-dimensional N=8 supergravity by dimensional reduction from the 11-dimensional theory. Julia also studied spontaneous symmetry breaking and the Higgs mechanism in supergravity

Other work includes a study, with Anthony Zee, of particles called dyons that carry both electric and magnetic charges and many papers on string theory, M-theory, and dualities.

In 1986, Julia was awarded the Prix Paul Langevin of the Société Française de Physique.

== See also ==
- Primon gas
