= Double field theory =

Field theory linked to string theory

Double field theory in theoretical physics refers to formalisms that capture the T-duality property of string theory as a manifest symmetry of a field theory.

== Background ==
In double field theory, the T-duality transformation of exchanging momentum and winding modes of closed strings on toroidal backgrounds translates to a generalized coordinate transformation on a doubled spacetime, where one set of its coordinates is dual to momentum modes and the second set of coordinates is interpreted as dual to winding modes of the closed string. Whether the second set of coordinates has physical meaning depends on how the level-matching condition of closed strings is implemented in the theory: either through the weak constraint or the strong constraint.

Weakly constrained double field theory, introduced by Chris Hull and Barton Zwiebach in 2009, allows for the fields to depend on the whole doubled spacetime and encodes genuine momentum and winding modes of the string. While early constructions were limited to cubic interactions, the formulation was extended to include quartic interactions on toroidal backgrounds in 2023 by Bonezzi, Chiaffrino, Díaz-Jaramillo and Hohm.

In strongly constrained double field theory, which was anticipated by Warren Siegel in 1993, the strong constraint ensures the dependency of the fields on only one set of the doubled coordinates; it describes the massless fields of closed string theory, i.e. the graviton, Kalb Ramond B-field, and dilaton, but does not include any winding modes, and serves as a T-duality invariant reformulation of supergravity.

Double field theory has been a setting for studying various string theoretical properties such as: consistent Kaluza-Klein truncations of higher-dimensional supergravity to lower-dimensional theories, generalized fluxes, and alpha-prime corrections of string theory in the context of cosmology and black holes.
