= GSO projection =

Superstring consistency requirement

The Gliozzi–Scherk–Olive (GSO) projection (named after Ferdinando Gliozzi, Joël Scherk, and David I. Olive) is an ingredient used in constructing a consistent model in superstring theory. The projection is a selection of a subset of possible vertex operators in the worldsheet conformal field theory (CFT)—usually those with specific worldsheet fermion number and periodicity conditions. Such a projection is necessary to obtain a consistent worldsheet CFT. For the projection to be consistent, the set A of operators retained by the projection must satisfy:

- Closure — The operator product expansion (OPE) of any two operators in A contains only operators which are in A.
- Mutual locality — There are no branch cuts in the OPE of any two operators in the set A.
- Modular invariance — The partition function on the two-torus of the theory containing only the operators in A respects modular invariance.

Starting from the same worldsheet CFT, different choices in the GSO projection will lead to string theories with different physical particles and properties in spacetime. For example, the Type II and Type 0 string theories result from different GSO projections on the same worldsheet theory. Furthermore, the two distinct Type II theories, IIA and IIB, differ in their GSO projections. In building models of realistic string vacua (as opposed to toy models), one typically chooses a GSO projection which eliminates the tachyonic ground state of the string and preserves spacetime supersymmetry.
