= Holger Bech Nielsen =

Danish physicist (born 1941)

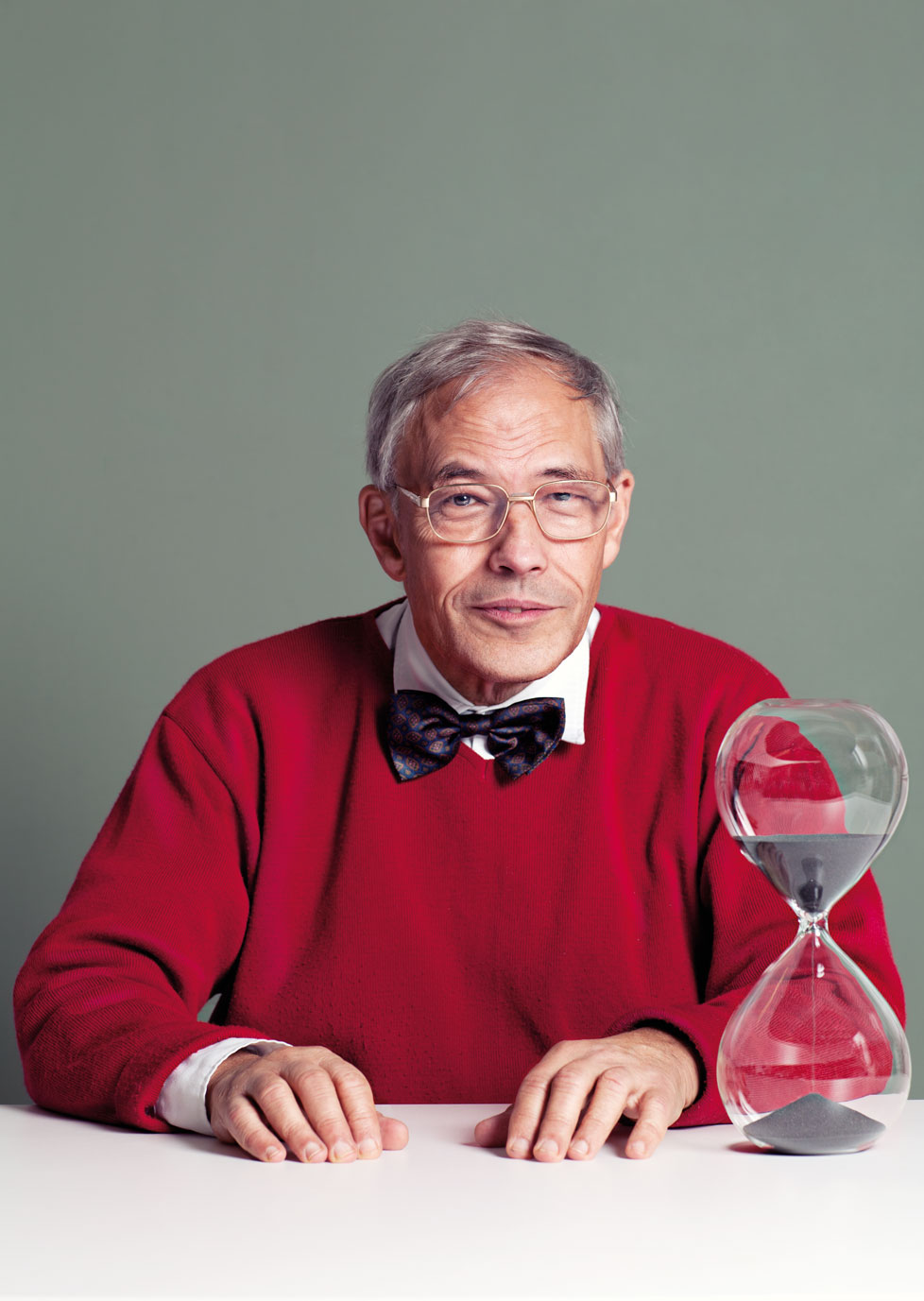
- Prof. Holger Bech Nielsen
- Born: 25 August 1941 (age 84); Copenhagen, Denmark
- Known for: String theory Nielsen–Ninomiya theorem Koba-Nielsen formula Nielsen–Olesen string Nielsen–Olesen vortex U(1) family symmetry
- Awards: Humboldt Prize (2001)
- Scientific career
- Fields: Theoretical physics
- Institutions: University of Copenhagen

Holger Bech Nielsen (born 25 August 1941) is a Danish theoretical physicist and professor emeritus at the Niels Bohr Institute, at the University of Copenhagen, where he started studying physics in 1961.

== Work ==
Nielsen has made original contributions to theoretical particle physics, specifically in the field of string theory. Independently of Yoichiro Nambu and Leonard Susskind, he was the first to propose that the Veneziano model was actually a theory of strings, leading him to be considered among the fathers of string theory. He was awarded the Humboldt Prize in 2001 for his research. Several physics concepts are named after him, e.g. Nielsen–Olesen vortex and the Nielsen-Ninomiya no-go theorem for representing chiral fermions on the lattice. In the original dual-models, which later would be recognized as the origins of string theory, the Koba–Nielsen variables are also named after him and his collaborator Ziro Koba.

Nielsen is known in Denmark for his enthusiastic public lectures on physics and string theory, and he is often interviewed in daily news, especially on matters regarding particle physics.

In a series of papers uploaded to arXiv in 2009, Nielsen and fellow physicist Masao Ninomiya proposed a radical theory to explain the seemingly improbable series of failures preventing the Large Hadron Collider (LHC) from becoming operational. The collider was intended to be used to find evidence of the hypothetical Higgs boson particle. They suggested that the particle might be so abhorrent to nature that its creation would ripple backward through time and stop the collider before it could create one, in a fashion similar to the time travel Grandfather paradox. Subsequently, the LHC claimed the discovery of Higgs boson on 4 July 2012.

Nielsen is a member of the Norwegian Academy of Science and Letters.

== See also ==
- Pregeometry (physics)
