= Joël Scherk =

French theoretical physicist (1946–1980)

- Born: 27 May 1946
- Died: 16 May 1980 (aged 33)
- Education: Paris-Sud University
- Known for: Scherk–Schwarz mechanism GSO projection
- Scientific career
- Fields: Theoretical physics
- Doctoral advisor: Claude Bouchiat; Philippe Meyer

Joël Scherk (French: [jɔɛl ʃɛʁk]; 27 May 1946 – 16 May 1980) was a French theoretical physicist who studied string theory and supergravity.

== Education ==
Scherk studied in Paris at the École Normale Supérieure (ENS). In 1969 he received his diploma (Thèse de troisième cycle) at University of Paris XI in Orsay with Philippe Meyer and Claude Bouchiat and in 1971 he completed his doctorate (Doctorat d'État) at the same time as his colleague André Neveu.

== Career ==
In 1974, together with John H. Schwarz, Scherk discovered that the Veneziano amplitude would have a massless spin-2 particle hypothesized as the graviton, soon it was realised that string theory was a theory of quantum gravity. In 1978, together with Eugène Cremmer and Bernard Julia, Scherk constructed the Lagrangian and supersymmetry transformations for eleven-dimensional supergravity, which is one of the foundations of M-theory.

== Death ==
He died unexpectedly, and in tragic circumstances, months after the supergravity workshop at the State University of New York at Stony Brook that was held on 27–29 September 1979. The workshop proceedings were dedicated to his memory, with a statement that Scherk, a diabetic, had been trapped somewhere without his insulin and went into a diabetic coma.

== Legacy ==
Two decades later, in his 2001 book Euclid's Window, author and theoretical physicist Leonard Mlodinow credited Schwarz and Scherk for their "astounding discovery" that gravity was part of string theory in a way that would "avoid contradictions between general relativity and quantum mechanics", but noted that Scherk suffered a breakdown, his wife left with their children, and he later committed suicide.

The high-energy theory library of the Laboratoire de Physique Théorique at École Normale Supérieure (Paris) is dedicated in his honor. A conference in Paris, on 16–20 October 2006, celebrating 30 years of supergravity, was dedicated to Scherk.

== See also ==
- GSO projection
