= List of honorary fellows of Clare Hall, Cambridge =

This is a list of Honorary Fellows of Clare Hall in the University of Cambridge. See also Category:Alumni of Clare Hall, Cambridge.

- Barbara Aland
- Eric Ashby, Baron Ashby
- Dame Gillian Beer
- Helaine Blumenfeld
- Lee Bollinger
- Frederick Burkhardt
- Sir Philip Campbell
- Norman Davies
- Richard J. Eden
- Ralph Erskine
- Michael Green
- Sir Martin Harris
- Sir Robert Honeycombe
- Caroline Humphrey
- David Ibbetson
- Kim Dae-jung
- Dame Emma Kirkby
- Michael Loewe
- Anthony Low
- Paul Mellon
- Sir Keith Peters
- Sir Brian Pippard
- Ra Jong Yil
- Martin Rees, Baron Rees of Ludlow
- Marilynne Robinson
- Ekhard Salje
- Ali Smith
- Sir Michael Stoker
- Stephen Toope
- Melanne Verveer
