= List of presidents of Clare Hall, Cambridge =

The following is a list of presidents of Clare Hall, Cambridge, since the college's foundation in 1966, the term of office for which is fixed at seven years:

- 1966 Sir Brian Pippard, physicist
- 1973 Sir Robert Honeycombe, metallurgist
- 1980 Sir Michael Stoker, virologist
- 1987 Anthony Low, historian
- 1994 Dame Gillian Beer, literary critic
- 2001 Ekhard Salje, mineralogist
- 2008 Sir Martin Harris, linguist
- 2013 David John Ibbetson, legal historian
- 2020 Alan Short, architect
