= Saul Dubow =

South African historian and academic

Saul Dubow FRHistS
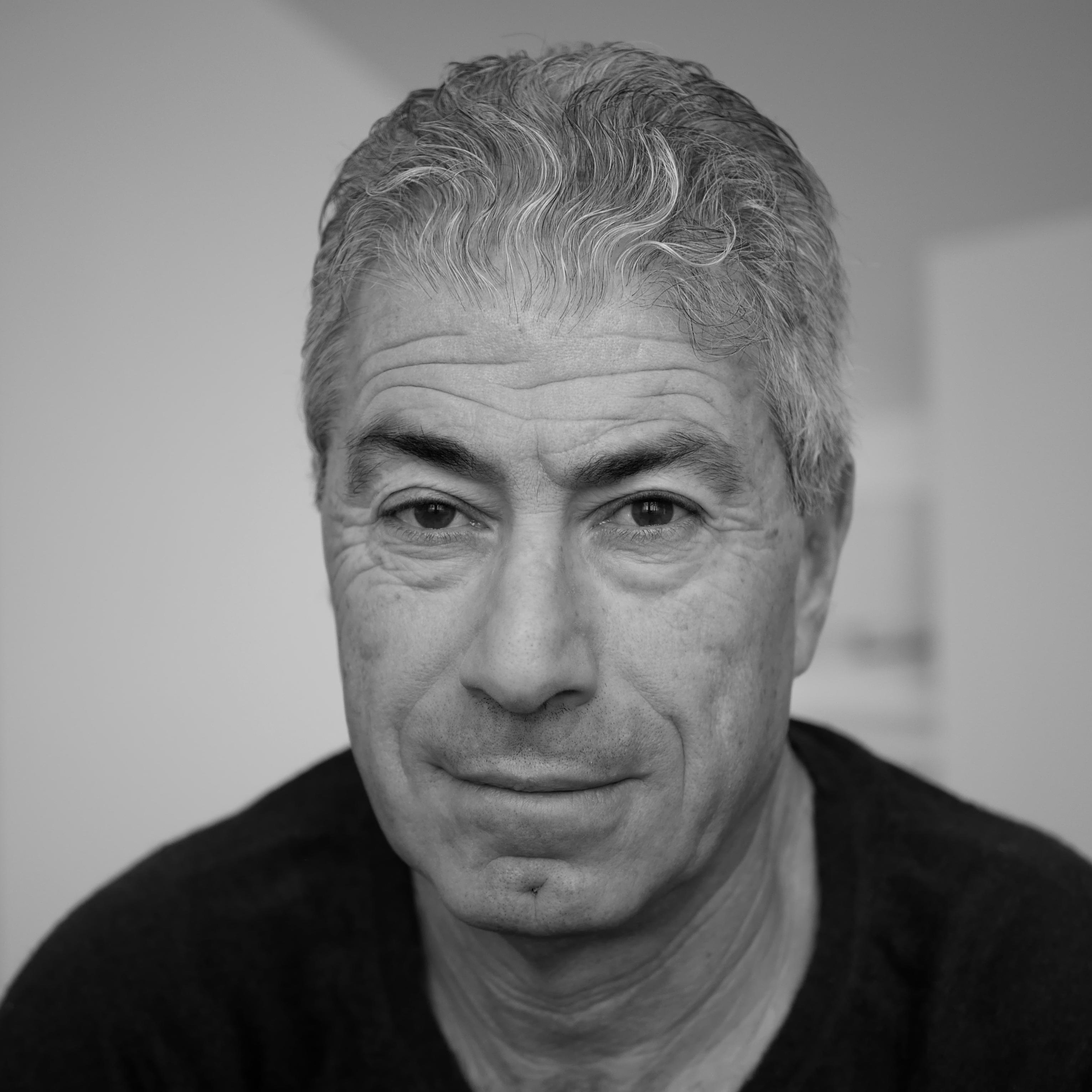
- Saul Dubow
- Born: 28 October 1959 (age 66); Cape Town, South Africa

Academic background
- Education: University of Cape Town; University of Oxford
- Thesis: Segregation and native administration in South Africa, 1920-1936 (1986)

Academic work
- Discipline: History
- Institutions: Institute of Commonwealth Studies; University of Sussex; Queen Mary, University of London; University of Cambridge; Magdalene College, Cambridge

Saul H. Dubow, FRHistS (born 28 October 1959) is a South African historian and academic, specialising in the history of South Africa in the nineteenth and twentieth centuries. Since 2016, he has been the Smuts Professor of Commonwealth History at the University of Cambridge and a Professorial Fellow of Magdalene College, Cambridge. He previously taught at University of Sussex and Queen Mary, University of London.

== Early life and education ==
Dubow was born on 28 October 1959 in Cape Town, South Africa. He studied at the University of Cape Town, graduating with a Bachelor of Arts (BA) degree in 1981. He then moved to England to undertake postgraduate studies at the University of Oxford. As a member of St Antony's College, Oxford, he completed his Doctor of Philosophy (DPhil) degree in 1986. His doctoral thesis was titled "Segregation and 'native administration' in South Africa, 1920-1936", which formed the basis for his first book, Racial Segregation and the Origins of Apartheid (1989).

== Academic career ==
From 1987 to 1989, Dubow was a British Academy post-doctoral fellow at the Institute of Commonwealth Studies, University of London. He then moved to the University of Sussex as a lecturer in 1989. Having been promoted to senior lecturer and reader over the intervening years, he was appointed Professor of History in 2001. He was awarded an Arts and Humanities Research Council fellowship for 2012. In 2013, he moved to Queen Mary, University of London where he had been appointed Professor of African History.

In October 2016, it was announced that he had been elected as the next Smuts Professor of Commonwealth History at the University of Cambridge in succession to Megan Vaughan. He took up the chair in 2017 and was additionally elected a Professorial Fellow of Magdalene College, Cambridge. Based in the Faculty of History, he teaches courses on the history of modern South Africa, and has wide ranging research interests from racial segregation and Apartheid to intellectual history and the history of science. He delivered his inaugural lecture in November 2018, which is published as `Global Science, National Horizons: South Africa in Deep Time and Space’, Historical Journal, published online by Cambridge University Press: 18 March 2020.

== Honours ==
Dubow is an elected Fellow of the Royal Historical Society (FRHistS). He is an honorary professor of the Centre for African Studies at the University of Cape Town. Editorial Board, South African Journal of Science and Journal of Southern African Studies; Chair, Management Committee, Centre of African Studies, Cambridge University.

== Selected works ==
- Dubow, Saul (1989). Racial Segregation and the Origins of Apartheid in South Africa, 1919–36. London: Palgrave Macmillan UK. ISBN 978-1-349-20041-2.
- Dubow, Saul (1995). Scientific Racism in Modern South Africa. Cambridge: Cambridge University Press. ISBN 978-0-521-47907-3.
- Beinart, William; Dubow, Saul, eds. (1995). Segregation and Apartheid in Twentieth Century South Africa. New York, NY: Routledge. ISBN 978-1-134-85033-4.
- Dubow, Saul (2000). The African National Congress. Cape Town: Jonathan Ball. ISBN 978-1-86842-097-1.
- Dubow, Saul, ed. (2000). Science and Society in Southern Africa. Manchester: Manchester University Press. ISBN 978-0-7190-5812-7.
- Dubow, Saul; Jeeves, Alan, eds. (2005). South Africa's 1940s: Worlds of Possibilities. Cape Town: Juta and Company Ltd. ISBN 978-1-77013-001-2.
- Dubow, Saul (2006). A Commonwealth of Knowledge: Science, Sensibility, and White South Africa 1820-2000. Oxford: Oxford University Press. ISBN 978-0-19-929663-7.
- Dubow, Saul (2012). South Africa's Struggle for Human Rights. Athens, Ohio: Ohio University Press. ISBN 978-0-8214-4440-5.
- Dubow, Saul (2014). Apartheid, 1948-1994. Oxford: Oxford University Press. ISBN 978-0-19-955067-8.
- Dubow, Saul, ed. (2013). The Rise and Fall of Modern Empires, Volume II: Colonial Knowledges. Farnham, UK: Ashgate. ISBN 978-1-40-943666-9.
- Dubow, Saul; Drayton, Richard, eds. (2020). Commonwealth History in the Twenty-First Century. London: Palgrave Macmillan. ISBN 978-3-030-41787-1.
- Dubow, Saul; Beinart, William (2021). The Scientific Imagination in South Africa 1700 to the Present. Cambridge: Cambridge University Press. doi:10.1017/9781108938198. ISBN 9781108837088. S2CID 241130845.

Academic offices
| Preceded by Megan Vaughan | Smuts Professor of Commonwealth History; 2017 to present | Incumbent |
