= Soone =

Soone is a surname. Notable people with the surname include:

- William Soone (fl. 1540–1575), English jurist and cartographer
- Francis Soone (by 1523–61), English Member of Parliament
