= Craig Sanders =

English director (born 1987)

- Born: 1987 (age 38–39)
- Education: Rose Bruford College
- Occupation: Theatre director
- Years active: 2008–present
- Known for: Buxton Opera House
- Website: mrcraigsanders.co.uk

Craig Sanders (born 1987) is an English director who graduated from Rose Bruford College with a BA (Hons) Theatre Studies. Craig was responsible for directing the Manchester production of Kafka's The Trial which played at Hope Mill Theatre and HOME MCR. The production later won a Manchester Theatre Award for "Best Fringe Production". In 2016, Craig directed Crimes Against Christmas at the Lichfield Garrick Theatre with New Old Friends who later won a Creative Bath Award. In 2017, Craig co-directed and choreographed The Dreaming at the Lichfield Garrick Theatre. Prior to this, Craig was resident at Buxton Opera House between 2013 and 2016 where he established a resident Young Company who performed Cush Jumbo's The Accordion Shop and Carl Grose's Gargantua as part of National Theatre Connections.

In 2018, Craig became the new manager of Trinity Arts Centre in Gainsborough for West Lindsey District Council.
