= Richard Eden =

Richard Eden may refer to:

- Richard Eden (translator), English alchemist and translator
- Richard Eden (actor), Canadian actor, screenwriter, and producer
- Richard J. Eden, British theoretical physicist
- Richard Eden (MP) for Sudbury (UK Parliament constituency)
