= Honeycombe =

Honeycombe is a surname. Notable people with the surname include:

- Gordon Honeycombe (1936–2015), British newscaster, actor and writer
- Robert Honeycombe (1921–2007), Australian academic
