= Eric Thomas Stokes =

British historian (1924–1981)

Eric Thomas Stokes (1924–1981) was a historian of South Asia, especially early-modern and colonial India, and of the British Empire. Stokes was the second holder of Smuts Professorship of the History of the British Commonwealth at the University of Cambridge.

He was the author of several books and an influential scholar of nineteenth century Indian history.

== Life and career ==
Stokes was born in Hampstead in 1924. He served for two years as a junior officer with the Indian Mountain Artillery. In 1950 he took up his first academic post at the University of Malaya in Singapore, followed by moves to the University of Bristol and University College of Rhodesia and Nyasaland in 1956. His doctoral research was expanded and published in 1959: The English Utilitarians and India. He was honoured with a posthumous festschrift, India's Colonial Encounter: Essays in Memory of Eric Stokes, published in 1993 and edited by Mushirul Hasan and Narayani Gupta.

== The Peasant Armed ==
The Peasant Armed: The Indian Revolt of 1857, was published posthumously in 1986 with Christopher Bayly editing the manuscript. Bayly argued that the book represented a major historical revision typical of British historians of the 1960-1970s, and were to be studies in the Lower Doab, Indian agrarian tracts covered by Chief Commissioner of Oudh, the Commissioner of Benares and Western Bihar in mid nineteenth century. The detailed treatment of the social origins of the revolt would have extended to all regions where mutiny was complemented by civil rebellion in 1857–59. Stokes however had not begun to write his conclusion at the time of his death in 1981.

Bayly writes, "in Stokes hierarchy of conditions for historical events of Indian Mutiny of 1857, ecology was the longue durée of Indian agrarian history in colonial period. Above this clustered a whole range of social and economic forces which determined the propensity to revolt and it was the specific decisions of British officers and Indian leaders which helped translate these propensities into historical action." "Stokes felt that history was generally a 'harmless pursuit' from which few general conclusions could emerge. His own view of political and social priorities derived not from historical theory but from a notion of natural law and from revealed religion.

The book chapters discuss the military dimension of the British response, as well of sepoy rebels, the peasant world and British administration. Stokes' own passion for the links between sepoy mutiny and civil rebellion in 1857, are explored in detail, with reference to Delhi region, Haryana countryside, Meerut District, Muzaffarnagar District and Saharanpur district.

== The India Connection ==
Bayly notes that, "Stokes returned again and again to the peasant world of India, by whose color and vitality he had been enthralled when serving as a subaltern in the Indian Mounted Artillery during the War. He completed detailed work on the Delhi area after visiting India in 1975-6. This visit seemed to prove to him the vacuousness of the broad caste categories."

=== Stokes and Caste as Category of Analysis ===
Bayly mentions that the chapters in The Peasant Armed, demonstrate a slow modification of the notion that caste was the key category of revolt or, in any simple sense, the basic unit of Indian rural society. Anthropologists in Britain and America were themselves moving away from the monolithic view of caste.

== Selected bibliography ==
- The English Utilitarians and India, Oxford: Clarendon Press. 1959.
- The Peasant and the Raj: Studies in Agrarian Society and Peasant Rebellion in Colonial India, Cambridge, Cambridge University Press. 1978. ISBN 978-0-521-21684-5
- The Peasant Armed: The Indian Revolt of 1857, Oxford: Clarendon Press. 1986. (Edited by C.A. Bayly) ISBN 978-0-19-821570-7.

== See also ==
- Company rule in India
- Thomas R. Metcalf

Academic offices
Preceded by Philip Nicholas Seton Mansergh	Smuts Professor of Commonwealth History Cambridge University; 1970 - 1981	Succeeded by Anthony Low
