= Brian Pippard =

British physicist (1920–2008)

Sir Brian Pippard FRS

1st President of Clare Hall, Cambridge
- In office 1966–1973
- Preceded by: Office established
- Succeeded by: Sir Robert Honeycombe

Personal details
- Born: Alfred Brian Pippard; 7 September 1920 London, England
- Died: 21 September 2008 (aged 88) Cambridge, England
- Spouse: Charlotte Dyer (m. 1955)
- Children: 3
- Parent: Alfred Pippard (father)
- Education: University of Cambridge: BA, Physics; PhD, Physics
- Awards: Hughes Medal (1959); Fernand Holweck Medal and Prize (1961); Dannie Heineman Prize (1969); Onsager Medal (2005)
- Scientific career
- Fields: Physics
- Workplaces: University of Cambridge
- Doctoral advisor: David Shoenberg
- Doctoral students: John Clarke; Brian Josephson; Stephen Geoffrey Lipson; Allan Mackintosh; John Shepherd

Sir Alfred Brian Pippard (7 September 1920 – 21 September 2008) was a British physicist. He was Cavendish Professor of Physics from 1971 to 1982, and an Honorary Fellow of Clare Hall, Cambridge, of which he was the first president.

== Biography ==
Alfred Brian Pippard was born on 7 September 1920 in London, the son of engineer Alfred John Sutton Pippard. He was educated at Clifton College, before gaining a scholarship in 1937 to attend Clare College, Cambridge, where he read physics, chemistry, physiology, and mathematics. Following the outbreak of World War II, Pippard switched from chemistry to physics, due to the demand for physicists. In 1941, he graduated with first-class honours in Part II of the Natural Sciences Tripos.

During World War II, Pippard worked as a scientific officer at the Radar Research and Development Establishment in Malvern, where he helped develop microwave radar techniques. After the war ended, he was awarded a Stokes Studentship, and returned to the University of Cambridge as a research student of David Shoenberg. He became a University Demonstrator in 1947, a University Lecturer in 1950, and a University Reader in 1959. He was appointed John Humphrey Plummer Professor of Physics in 1960, and served as Cavendish Professor of Physics from 1971 until his retirement in 1982.

As Cavendish Professor of Physics, Pippard compiled Cavendish Problems in Classical Physics, based in large part on past examination questions for Cambridge physics students.

In 1961, his graduate student Brian Josephson was working on an experimental project (the magnetic field dependence of the penetration depth), when, in his spare time, he developed a new theory of quantum tunnelling between superconductors (now known as the Josephson effect). He submitted this work as a Fellowship dissertation to Trinity College, Cambridge, and it subsequently earned him the Nobel Prize in Physics in 1973.

In 1966, Pippard became the first president of the newly-founded Clare Hall, Cambridge.

== Research ==
Pippard demonstrated the reality, as opposed to the mere abstract concept, of Fermi surfaces in metals by establishing the shape of the Fermi surface of copper through measuring the reflection and absorption of microwave electromagnetic radiation (see the anomalous skin effect). He also introduced the notion of coherence length in superconductors in his proposal for the non-local generalisation of the London equations concerning electrodynamics in superfluids and superconductors. The non-local kernel proposed by Pippard, inferred on the basis of Chambers' non-local generalisation of Ohm's law) can be deduced within the framework of the BCS (Bardeen, Cooper and Schrieffer) theory of superconductivity (a comprehensive description of the details of the London–Pippard theory can be found in the book by Fetter and Walecka).

Pippard was the author of Elements of Classical Thermodynamics for Advanced Students of Physics, Dynamics of Conduction Electrons, and The Physics of Vibration. He also co-authored the three-volumes encyclopaedia Twentieth Century Physics.

== Personal life and death ==
In 1955, Pippard married Charlotte Dyer, with whom he had three daughters.

Pippard died on 21 September 2008 at the age of 88.

== Recognition ==
=== Memberships ===
Year	Organisation	Type	Ref.
1956	Royal Society	Fellow	
1970	American Academy of Arts and Sciences	International Honorary Member	

=== Awards ===
Year	Organisation	Award	Citation	Ref.
1959	Royal Society	Hughes Medal	"For his distinguished contributions in the field of low temperature physics."	
1961	Institute of Physics; Société Française de Physique	Fernand Holweck Medal and Prize	—	
1969	Göttingen Academy of Sciences and Humanities	Dannie Heineman Prize	"For his work on the dynamics of conduction electrons in metals, in particular the measurement of the Fermi surface of copper and the non-local extension of London’s electrodynamics of the superconductor."	
2005	Norwegian University of Science and Technology	Onsager Medal	—	

=== Honours ===
Year	Country	Honour	Ref.
1975	United Kingdom	Knight Bachelor	

== Obituaries ==
- Anthony Tucker, Sir Brian Pippard, The Guardian, Wednesday, 25 September 2008, .
- John Waldram, Professor Sir Brian Pippard (1920–2008), News and Events, University Offices, University of Cambridge, 24 September 2008, .
- Professor Sir Brian Pippard (1920–2008), Cambridge Network, 25 September 2008, (Reproduced from University of Cambridge Office of Communications).
- John Waldram, Brian Pippard (1920–2008): Low-temperature physicist who excelled in subtle intuitive concepts, Nature 455, 1191 (30 October 2008), .
- Professor Sir Brian Pippard, Telegraph, 23 September 2008, .
- Professor Sir Brian Pippard: Cambridge physicist, The Times, 25 September 2008, .
- Richard Eden, Professor Sir Brian Pippard: Physicist who proved the existence of the Fermi surface and was the first President of Clare Hall, Cambridge, The Independent, Tuesday, 7 October 2008, .
- Hamish Johnston, Sir Brian Pippard: 1920–2008, PhysicsWorld, 24 September 2008, .

Academic offices
Preceded by New Title	President of Clare Hall, Cambridge; 1966–1973	Succeeded by Sir Robert Honeycombe
