= Kensington School =

Kensington Proprietary Grammar School

Location
- Kensington Square; Kensington, Greater London; England
- Coordinates: 51.5002°N 0.1908°W

Information
- Type: Proprietary School
- Motto: dms
- Religious affiliation: Church of England
- Established: 1830
- Closed: 1896
- Gender: boys
- Age: 11 to 18

The Kensington Proprietary Grammar School, colloquially referred to as the Kensington School, was an educational establishment founded in 1830 that is perhaps best remembered for being one of the founders of the Football Association in 1863.

== History ==
Kensington School was established in 1830 in union with the Corporation of King's College London for the purpose "of providing an efficient course of education for youth, comprising religious and moral instruction in conformity with the principles of the Established Church, the Greek, Latin and Modern languages anc literature, History, Geography, Mathematics and such other branches of knowledge and such accomplishments as it may be practicable and advantageous to introduce." It was intended to create a first-grade institution in connection with the Church of England. The Vicar of Kensington was the President the Bishop of London was the Patron. The school opened on 24 January 1831 with twenty pupils. The proprietors had taken a house on a short tenure in Kensington Square, the intention being that if after a trial period of two years the school was a success they would either take a lease or go elsewhere. The school quickly established itself.

The system of education to be adopted was prepared a few days before the school opened in 1831 by the Rev. T. S. Evans, the first headmaster. Approximately one third of the boys' time was to be devoted to the study of Latin and Greek, slightly more time to religious instruction, history, mathematics and arithmetic, and slightly less to French, geography and writing. The monitorial system of teaching was employed, whereby the masters taught only the monitors who in turn passed on the instruction they had received to their schoolfellows. By the time the school was about to take possession of the new schoolroom in January 1834, this system was abandoned in favour of the boys being divided into six separate classes. These classes were all held in the one large room, until 1837, when two new classrooms were added to the existing building. In 1838 the school acquired the next-door house at No. 26 and in 1845 another two classrooms were built on top of the original schoolroom. In 1834, dancing and drawing were introduced.

The school had immediately established an annual award of an exhibition at the Universities of the value of £50 a year for three years. Additionally it awarded an Indian cadetship, said to have formed the greatest attraction for pupils. In 1841 the school provided special courses to prepare boys for the East India Company's colleges at Haileybury and Addiscombe. As a result, Hindustani, military drawing, fortification, drill and fencing were all gradually introduced. A cadetship was created in 1842 by Sir Henry Willock, a Director of the East India Company, who was also one of the Directors of the School. The cadetship was an annual appointment to Addiscombe. This was to be "for the youth at Kensington School who may surpass his fellow students in merit and learning". The award lasted for nineteen years and not only attracted boys to the school but also directed school studies towards preparation for military life.

In 1845, when the number of pupils had reached 130, of whom 85 were boarders, the directors decided to buy No. 28 Kensington Square and use it as a boarding house, in order to relieve pressure on the headmaster's own house. However, only a part of No. 28 was used in this way, the rest being let to the second master at £70 per annum, while his former residence at No. 26 was added to the headmaster's house. In 1849, gas-lighting was installed in the lower rooms at Nos. 26 and 27 and later the school library was in No. 26. More classrooms were built in the back garden of No. 28 in 1853. By 1857, Kensington School held a high position, due to the success of its scholars at the Universities and more especially to the number of boys trained for the military services. It is said that the curriculum of Kensington School supplied a want which the public schools had not yet attempted to meet in that, prior to the mid-nineteenth century, the study of classics was supreme in the public schools, with mathematics, modern languages and science but only tolerated. Although this changed in the latter half of the century, Kensington were already satisfying the requirements of parents and giving also what the Universities and military examiners wanted.

Records suggest that by 1857, despite the school's enhanced academic reputation, the headmaster of the time had allowed general discipline in the school to relax, so deeply immersed was he in the study of oriental literature. The indiscipline was not confined to pupils. The second master was allowed to keep as boarders private pupils who did not belong to the school. The formidable Haig Brown joined the school in 1857 instilling a sense of discipline once again and he remained at Kensington till 1863. His departure for Charterhouse was perhaps one of the causes which led eventually to the collapse of Kensington School. It is possible that, had he remained there, his powerful influence might have induced the Directors to oppose the Bill presented in Parliament by the Metropolitan Railway Company for powers to appropriate the playground, and they might thus have obtained sufficient compensation to enable them to remove the school elsewhere. The loss of the playground in 1865 was the chief cause of the final disbandment of the school. A much smaller playground was made in the back garden of No. 25, taken on lease in about 1864 and sub-let as a boarding house to one of the assistant masters.

By 1869, there were only 45 pupils left, and the school had accumulated debts of over £2,000. In July 1869, therefore, the proprietors voted to close it down and sold the school buildings to the Rev. Charles Tabor Ackland, one of the assistant masters. His intention to open an Endowed Grammar School did not take place until 1873. In the meantime Ackland assumed the headmastership and carried on the school on his own responsibility as the Kensington Foundation Grammar School, formally established under this name in July 1873. Under Ackland's headship the school flourished and within ten years of re-opening it had 130 pupils. In 1881, Ackland resigned and soon numbers began to fall off, particularly after the opening in 1884 of St. Paul's School in Hammersmith, only one-and-a-quarter miles from Kensington Square. In 1890 the headmaster tried to close the school but the trustees would not allow this, and it struggled on for a few more years until in 1896, When there were only ten or twelve pupils, it did finally close. The trustees, who by then had let all five houses fronting the square to private tenants, still hoped to use the back premises for educational work, and their scheme for the Kensington School of Science and Art received the approval of the Charity Commissioners in 1898 but was abandoned when the trustees found themselves unable to pay off the mortgage debt on the property.

== Sport ==
Kensington School
- Founded: 1861
- Dissolved: 1871 (changed to rugby)
- Ground: Palace Green
Home colours

The school was also famous for its athletic attainments and for the zeal with which all games, especially cricket and football, were pursued. It contributed more than one captain to the Cambridge and Oxford University elevens, and was the first school in England to institute a public "sports" day. The sports were known to fashionable London as the "Kensington Races."

=== Founder member of the Football Association ===
At the time of the school's inception in 1830, football had yet to find a uniform code of play, and neither Association or Rugby football had yet been formalised. The style of football that had become increasingly popular since its inception at Rugby School was not adopted by the Proprietary School. They tended towards the dribbling game, represented to an extent by Eton's code and which would be set down formally in Cambridge rules in 1848. However, even the apparent acceptance of these rule sets for these two variations in the game did not avert controversy over the rules by which teams should play. With the exception of a rationalised and uniform football culture that was emerging in Sheffield in the 1850s, across the United Kingdom from club to club and school to school there was little agreement over the elements of a football game, be that the time it should take to play, the number of players in a side, or indeed whether running with the ball was illegal or not. Teams had to agree on rules before a match, or had to agree to play the code of each team for one half of the match each.

In order to allow matches to take place without such constraints and problems, a number of captains and representatives from various London clubs met at Freemasons' Tavern in Lincoln's Inn Fields on 26 October 1863. Kensington School was one of the twelve teams represented, and thus became a founder member of the Football Association.

The school remained a member of the Football Association until 1871, by which time it had switched codes to rugby. The school did not play many Association matches; the first recorded was against Harrow School in 1864.

== Buildings ==
The school was established at No. 31 Kensington Square in 1831 The proprietors had taken that house on a short tenure and within a year of opening the number of pupils had doubled and the schoolroom had had to be enlarged. The proprietors nevertheless decided against taking a lease of No. 31, due to the potential £600 ‘substantial repairs’, and in June 1833 purchased the freehold of No. 27. This was an old house that had stood empty for some years and the proprietors planned to rebuild it. At the same time two-and-a-half acres of ground was leased behind the house, previously William Cobbett's nursery, for use as a playground. No. 27. had always been the largest house on the west side of the square and was the second to be erected on the site and dated from 1833–4, especially built for the school. The original house was built in the mid-1690s by the woodmonger John Kemp. Later occupants included the Marquis du Court 1700–1, ‘Lady Illey’ 1722, and Stephen Ashby (c. 1732–52), benefactor of St. Bartholomews Hospital, Christ's Hospital and Bethlehem Hospital.

The rebuilding of No. 27 was carried out by George Todd of Chelsea in 1833–4 at a cost of some £3,500, the architect was William Crake of Notting Hill, "a gentleman of professional eminence and skill", although William was a builder and it is likely his relation John was the architect. The new school was in two parts: a front building, on the site of the old house, known as School House, intended as the headmaster's residence, but it also contained other facilities such as a dining-room for the boys and bedrooms and a dormitory for boarders. A separate schoolroom was behind. The school was four storeys high with an austere brick fronth. Certain original elements were kept, such as the staircase above the ground floor. The walls were originally painted ‘light Tea-Green’, the skirting a shade darker and the cornices lighter: the colour of the ceiling was to be either ‘a reflection of the wall’ or cream ‘as may be designed best to Harmonise the General Appearance of the Room, Observing that the prevailing color of the furniture is Red’. The boys' bedrooms were on the top floor. The first and second floors were evidently occupied by the headmaster, to whom the house was let for £80 a year.

The schoolroom was housed in a free-standing single-storey building at the back of the main house from which it was separated by a paved playground covered by a corrugated-iron roof, known as the ‘tectum’. A passageway through the basement storey of No. 27 gave direct access to the playground and schoolroom from Kensington Square. West of the schoolroom was the large open playground. In 1838 the proprietors acquired the next-door house at No. 26, where two more classrooms were erected in the back garden. At the same time the ‘tectum’ was extended behind No. 26. with the house itself was leased to the school's second master for £65 a year. In 1845 another two classrooms were built on top of the original schoolroom.

In 1881, the year of Ackland's resignation, the trustees spent £3,650 on building works at the school enlarging classrooms and building fives courts behind Nos. 28 and 29, and other various alterations. The alterations at the three houses were partly intended to prepare them for letting to private tenants as the school contracted. In 1898 the whole site was then offered for sale at auction but failed to attract a buyer, and in 1900 the trustees agreed to sell it to Derry and Toms for £20,500 but this was superseded when the Crown, which had been negotiating to buy the free hold of various properties occupied by Derry and Toms, agreed to buy the freehold of the Grammar School site and let it to Derry's on a lease expiring in 1949. Although Nos. 28 and 29 Kensington Square continued to be occupied by private tenants, the other three houses in the square were used to provide accommodation for Derry and Toms' staff, and the back premises were converted for use as workshops. The only survival from the days of the school is the ‘cottage’ behind No. 28, known as 27a, which is the ‘new building’ of 1846.

== Headmasters ==
- Rev. T. S. Evans (1831–34)
- Francis Hessey
- Robert Payne Smith (1853–57)
- Rev. William Haig Brown (1857–63)
- Joseph Bickersteth Mayor (1863–69)
- Rev. Sampson Kingsford
- Rev. Charles Tabor Ackland (1869–81)

== Notable former pupils ==
- John Thomas Abdy (1822-1899) - academic
- William Alexander Forbes (1855-1883) - zoologist
