= John Thomas Abdy =

English legal scholar and academic (1822–1899)

John Thomas Abdy (5 July 1822 – 25 September 1899) was an English legal scholar, who was Regius Professor of Civil Law at Cambridge University.

== Life ==
John Thomas Abdy was the son and heir of Lt.-Col. James Nicholas Abdy of the East India Company. His early education was at the Kensington Proprietary Grammar School. He graduated in 1844 from Trinity Hall, Cambridge. He received a Bachelor of Laws (LLB) degree in 1847 and a Doctor of Laws (LLD) degree in 1852.

In 1850 he became a fellow of Trinity Hall, Cambridge and was called to the bar. From 1854 to 1872, he was Regius Professor of Civil Law at the University of Cambridge. In 1858, he additionally became Gresham Professor of Law in London, lecturing on the history of feudalism. In 1871 he became a judge in the new county court system.

== Works ==
- Historical Sketch of Civil Procedure among the Romans, Cambridge, 1857.
- (ed.) Kent's Commentary on International Law, revised with notes and cases brought down to the present time, Cambridge, 1866. 2nd ed., 1878.
- (tr. with Bryan Walker) The Commentaries of Gaius, Cambridge, 1870.
- (tr. with Bryan Walker) The Institutes of Justinian, Cambridge, 1876.
- (tr. with Bryan Walker) The Commentaries of Gaius and Rules of Ulpian, Cambridge, 1885.
- Feudalism: its rise, progress, and consequences: lectures delivered at Gresham College, London, 1890.
