= Allan Mackintosh =

Danish physicist (1936–1995)

Allan R. Mackintosh
- Born: 22 January 1936; Nottingham, England
- Died: 20 December 1995 (aged 59); Roskilde, Denmark
- Education: University of Cambridge (1957, 1960)
- Awards: Spedding Prize (1986); Fellow of the Royal Society (1991)
- Scientific career
- Fields: Magnetism and neutron scattering; rare-earth metals; solid-state physics
- Doctoral advisor: Brian Pippard

Allan Roy Mackintosh, FRS (22 January 1936 – 20 December 1995) was a prominent Danish physicist and a leading authority on magnetism and neutron scattering, especially in the rare-earth metals.

Mackintosh was known for his key role in stimulating solid-state physics research in Denmark and for his advocacy of international collaboration. Many of his former students now occupy leading academic and industrial posts in a variety of countries. As director of the Danish Atomic Energy Research Establishment from 1971 to 1976 he was a major force in Danish science policy and a prolific contributor to the public debate about nuclear power.

== Early life and education ==
Mackintosh was born on 22 January 1936 in Nottingham, England and received his university education at Peterhouse, Cambridge (Bachelor of Arts in 1957, PhD in 1960). His doctoral research at Cambridge was carried out in the renowned Cavendish Laboratory under Sir Brian Pippard, where he investigated the Fermi surface of metals.

== Career ==
On leaving Cambridge in 1960, he became Associate Professor of Physics at Iowa State University and worked in its Ames Laboratory for seven years. This is where he established himself as a leading expert on the fundamental electrical and magnetic properties of the newly purified group of elements, the rare-earth metals.

During a 1966 sabbatical at the Riso National Laboratory in Denmark, Mackintosh discovered a technique to quantify the magnetic moments on an atomic scale using the newly constructed neutron spectrometer. His measurements of the spin waves in rare-earth metals marked a significant advance in the study of magnetism, for which he was awarded (jointly with Hans Bjerrum Møller) the prestigious Spedding Prize in 1986.

In 1970, he became Professor of Experimental Solid State Physics at the University of Copenhagen, a chair he held until his death. From 1971 to 1976 he also served as Director of the Riso National Laboratory, and from 1986 to 1989 as Director of NORDITA (the Nordic Institute for Theoretical Physics), with its close connections to the Niels Bohr Institute. Mackintosh was also President of the Danish Physical Society from 1976 to 1979, and President of the European Physical Society from 1980 to 1982.

Long known for his careful yet lucid prose, Mackintosh's publication in 1991, with Jens Jensen, of Rare Earth Magnetism, was a landmark in solid-state physics and the book became a classic text. In the same year he was elected Fellow of the Royal Society. In Denmark, he was made a Knight of the Dannebrog Order. He was also a Fellow of the Royal Danish Academy of Sciences and Letters, the Danish Academy of Technical Sciences, the Royal Norwegian Scientific Academy, and the American Physical Society. Uppsala University awarded him an honorary doctorate of philosophy in 1980.

Mackintosh was also noted for a widely quoted 1988 article in Scientific American, where he argued for wider recognition of John Vincent Atanasoff's key role as the inventor of the first electronic digital computer (the Atanasoff–Berry Computer).

== Personal life ==
He married the Danish-born Jette Stannow, whom he met in Cambridge, in 1958. The couple had one son, Paul Erik (born 1962), and two daughters, Anne Karen (born 1959) and Ida Alys (born 1964).

== Death ==
He died on 20 December 1995 in Roskilde, Denmark, after a car accident.
