= Clair Wills =

British academic

Clair Wills FBA, HonMRIA
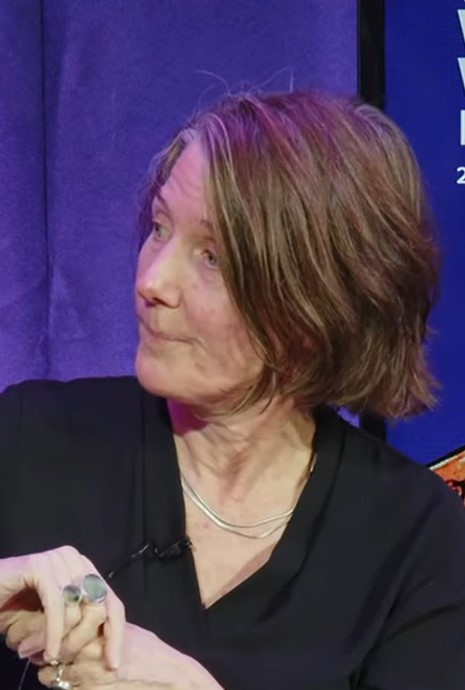
- Wills in November 2024

Academic background
- Education: Somerville College, Oxford

Academic work
- Discipline: Cultural studies
- Sub-discipline: Cultural history; Irish literature; Twentieth-century English literature; Irish revolutionary period; History of Ireland (1801–1923); History of the Republic of Ireland
- Institutions: University of Essex; Queen Mary University of London; Princeton University; Murray Edwards College, Cambridge; Faculty of English, University of Cambridge
- Notable works: That Neutral Island (2007); Lovers and Strangers: An Immigrant History of Post-War Britain (2017)

Clair Wills, FBA, HonMRIA, is a British academic specialising in 20th-century British and Irish cultural history and literature. Since 2019, she has been King Edward VII Professor of English Literature at the University of Cambridge and a fellow of Murray Edwards College, Cambridge. After studying at the Somerville College, Oxford, she taught at the University of Essex and Queen Mary University of London. She was then Leonard L. Milberg ’53 Chair of Irish Letters at Princeton University from 2015 to 2019, before moving to Cambridge.

== Honours ==
In 2016, Wills was elected an Honorary Member of the Royal Irish Academy (HonMRIA). In July 2020, she was elected a Fellow of the British Academy (FBA), the United Kingdom's national academy for the humanities and social sciences.

In 2008, Wills was awarded the Hessell-Tiltman Prize for her book That Neutral Island: A cultural history of Ireland during the Second World War (2007). In 2018, she was shortlisted for the Orwell Prize for her book Lovers and Strangers: An Immigrant History of Post-War Britain (2017).

== Selected works ==
- Improprieties: politics and sexuality in Northern Irish poetry. Oxford: Clarendon Press. 1993. ISBN 978-0198112686.
- Reading Paul Muldoon. Newcastle upon Tyne: Bloodaxe. 1998. ISBN 978-1852243470.
- That Neutral Island: A cultural history of Ireland during the Second World War. London: Faber. 2007. ISBN 978-0571221059.
- Dublin 1916: the siege of the GPO. London: Profile Books. 2009. ISBN 978-1846680533.
- The Best Are Leaving: emigration and post-war Irish culture. New York, NY: Cambridge University Press. 2015. ISBN 978-1107048409.
- Lovers and Strangers: an immigrant history of post-war Britain. London: Allen Lane. 2017. ISBN 978-1846147166.
- Missing Persons, Or My Grandmother's Secrets. London: Allen Lane. 2024. ISBN 9780241640951.

Academic offices
Preceded by David Trotter	King Edward VII Professor of English Literature; University of Cambridge; 2019 to present	Incumbent
