= Stephen Geoffrey Lipson =

Israeli physicist

- Steve Lipson in class (circa 1970)
- Born: 8 January 1941; Cambridge, England
- Education: University of Cambridge
- Scientific career
- Fields: Physics
- Workplaces: Technion
- Doctoral advisor: Brian Pippard

Stephen (Steve) Geoffrey Lipson (born 8 January 1941) is an Israeli-British physicist. He is Emeritus Professor of Physics at Technion and lead author of the textbook "Optical Physics".

== Background ==
Lipson was born in Cambridge, England, to Jane Rosenthal and Henry Lipson. His father was a pioneer in the field of Crystallography, which exposed Lipson to physics from a young age. In 1945 he moved with his parents to Manchester, where he attended Manchester Grammar School and won a physics scholarship from Trinity College, Cambridge.

At Cambridge, Lipson pursued undergraduate studies in Physics and Mathematics (1958-1961), and a PhD in Physics (1961-1966) at the Cavendish Laboratory under the supervision of Brian Pippard. In 1966, he joined Technion, retiring as a full professor in 2009.

== Research ==
During his tenure at the Technion, Lipson held the El-Op Chair of Electro-Optics and conducted research and authored over 240 papers in the fields of low temperature physics and optical physics. He also coauthored several textbooks and monographs.

Lipson's academic work focused on several areas:

- Superfluids: He published research on the properties of superfluids, including a paper demonstrating evidence for facets at a quantum-fluid/solid interface (not just classical material).
- Surface melting and ice studies: Lipson conducted research on the physical properties of surfaces, including the surface melting of ice. He investigated the "electrofreezing effect" and the nucleation of ice crystals during free growth experiments.
- Granular materials: His work also addressed the dynamics of granular materials, such as his 1994 publication on the "rotationally induced segregation of granular materials," which appeared in Physical Review Letters.
- Interferometric astronomy: A co-author of the textbook An Introduction to Optical Stellar Interferometry, Lipson's research interests extended to applying optical techniques in astronomy. He also co-authored a book on the topic with Antoine Labeyrie and Peter Nisenson.
- Imaging and spectroscopy: Lipson has patented a "method for simultaneously measuring the spectral intensity as a function of wavelength of all the pixels of a two dimensional scene". Other work involved measuring the modulation transfer function of a lens and developing a monolithic piezoelectric mirror for wavefront correction.
- Surface plasmon resonance: He has published several papers related to surface plasmon resonance, comparing the sensitivities of phase and intensity detection methods.

=== Other publications ===
- Lipson, Stephen G.; Lipson, Henry S.; Tannhauser, D. S. (7 March 2013). Optik (in German). Springer-Verlag. ISBN 978-3-642-59053-5.
- Estermann, Immanuel; Lipson, Stephen G. (1972). Physics in Israel and Its Industrial Applications. National Council for Research and Development.

== Selected patents ==
- Method for simultaneously measuring the spectral intensity as a function of wavelength of all the pixels of a two dimensional scene.
- Monolithic piezoelectric wavefront phase modulator.
- Determination of thin film topography.
- System and method for producing a light beam with spatially varying polarization.
- Plasmon resonance phase imaging.
- Surface plasmon resonance sensor.
- Optical storage device using piezoelectric read-out
