= George Keeton =

England international rugby union player

- Keeton and Edward, Prince of Wales
- Full name: George Haydn Keeton
- Born: 13 October 1878 Peterborough, England
- Died: 7 January 1949 (aged 70) Menton, England
- School: Oakham School
- University: Emmanuel College, Cambridge
- Notable relative(s): Haydn Keeton (father); Nicholas Mansergh (son-in-law) Martin Mansergh (grandson)
- Occupation: Schoolmaster

Rugby union career
- Position: Hooker
Senior career
Years	Team	Apps	(Points)
1896–1904	Leicester Tigers	45	(30)
International career
Years	Team	Apps	(Points)
1904	England	3	(0)

George Haydn Keeton (13 October 1878 – 7 January 1949) was a rugby union player for Leicester Tigers, Richmond and an English international rugby union player.

== Biography ==
Born in Peterborough, Keeton was the son of Peterborough Cathedral organist Haydn Keeton.

Keeton attended Oakham School in Rutland, followed by further studies at Emmanuel College, Cambridge, where he took first class honours and was a two-time Cambridge rugby blue. Keeton played club rugby for Leicester Tigers, making his debut on 12 February 1896 against Bedford School he was a regular in the first team by the end of 1898. He played intermittently after 1900, but featured for Leicester on 1 January & 2 January 1904 on the club's north-eastern tour and again on 16 January 1904 against Gloucester either side of his England debut. Keeton gained three England caps as a hooker in 1904, his other clubs at the time were Edinburgh Wanderers, having moved to Scotland to work as a master at Fettes College, and Richmond.

From 1910 to 1914, Keeton was headmaster of Pocklington School, and afterwards became the headmaster of Reading School between 1914 and 1939.

Keeton's daughter Diana married historian Nicholas Mansergh.

== See also ==
- List of England national rugby union players
