= William Beinart =

South African historian

William Beinart (born January 19, 1951, in Cape Town) is a South African historian and Africanist. He was educated at the University of Cape Town and School of Oriental and African Studies at the University of London. He taught at the University of Bristol from 1983 to 1997. At the University of Oxford he was a Professor of Race Relations from 1997 to 2015, and held positions as the Director of the African Studies Centre (2002-6 and 2014-5), co-chair of the School of Interdisciplinary Area Studies (SIAS, 2006-8), and Director of Graduate Studies at the African Studies Centre, St Antony's College (2009-13).

Beinart was chair of the Board of the Journal of Southern African Studies from 1992-8 and President of the African Studies Association of the UK from 2008-10. He was elected to the British Academy in 2009.

His research focuses on South Africa and on the developments of racism.

== Selected works ==
- Beinart, William; Dubow, Saul, eds. (1995). Segregation and Apartheid in Twentieth Century South Africa. New York, NY: Routledge. ISBN 978-1-134-85033-4.
- William Beinart (2008). The Rise of Conservation in South Africa: Settlers, Livestock, and the Environment 1770-1950 (Pbk. ed.). Oxford: Oxford University Press. ISBN 978-0-19-954122-5.
- William Beinart; Luvuyo Wotshela (2011). Prickly Pear: A Social History of a Plant in the Eastern Cape. Johannesburg: Witwatersrand University Press. ISBN 978-1-86814-530-0.
