= Smuts Professor of Commonwealth History =

Professorship at the University of Cambridge

The Smuts Professorship of Commonwealth History was established on 25 October 1952 as the Smuts Professorship of the History of the British Commonwealth; it was retitled in 1994. The professorship is assigned to the Faculty of History at the University of Cambridge.

== List of Smuts Professors of Commonwealth History ==
- Philip Nicholas Seton Mansergh (1953–1970)
- Eric Thomas Stokes (1970–1981)
- Donald Anthony Low (1983–1994)
- A. G. Hopkins (1994–2002)
- Megan Vaughan (2002–2016)
- Saul Dubow (2017–)
