= Basil Willey =

British academic

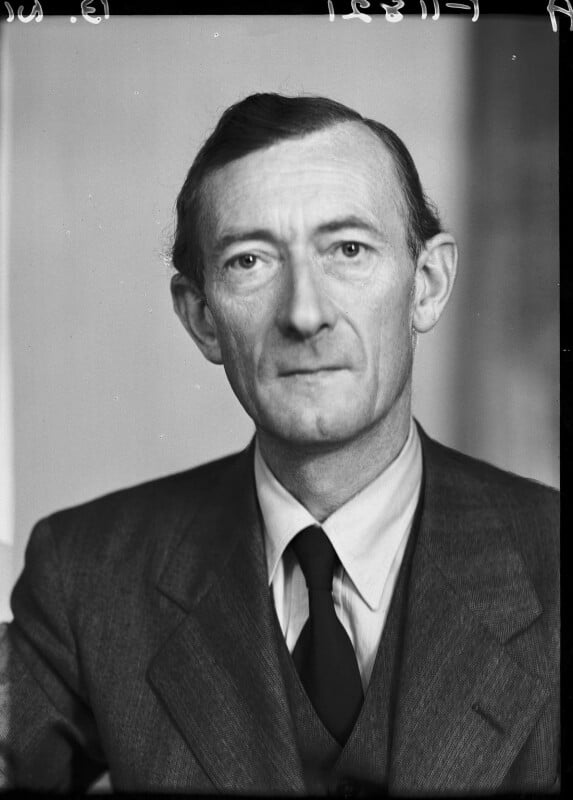
Willey in 1949

Basil Willey, FBA, FRSL (25 July 1897 – 3 September 1978) was a British scholar of English literature and intellectual history. Having served in the British Army during the First World War, he rose to become King Edward VII Professor of English Literature at the University of Cambridge from 1946 and President of Pembroke College from 1958 to until his retirement in 1964.

== Biography ==
He was born in London in 1897 and educated at University College School, Hampstead, and Peterhouse, Cambridge, where he won a scholarship in 1915; conscripted into the West Yorkshire Regiment soon after, he eventually graduated in 1921 with a first-class degree in History and English. He became a fellow of Pembroke College in 1935. He was appointed King Edward VII Professor of English Literature in 1946. He served as President of Pembroke College from 1958 to 1964. He retired from his position as King Edward VII Professor of English Literature in 1965.

He was a Fellow of the British Academy (FBA) and a Fellow of the Royal Society of Literature (FRSL). He was a member of the Athenaeum Club in London.

== Published works ==
- Tendencies in Renaissance Literary Theory (1921-22 Le Bas Prize Essay) (1922)
- The Seventeenth Century Background : Studies in the Thought of the Age in Relation to Poetry and Religion (1934)
- The Eighteenth Century Background : Studies on the Idea of Nature in the Thought of the Period (1940)
- Nineteenth Century Studies : Coleridge to Matthew Arnold (1949)
- Christianity Past and Present (1952)
- More nineteenth century studies: A group of honest doubters (1956)
- The Religion of Nature (1957)
- Darwin and Butler: Two Versions of Evolution: The Hibbert Lectures of 1959 (1960)
- The English Moralists (1964)
- Cambridge and other Memories, 1920-1953 (1968 - Published by Chatto and Windus, London)
- Religion to-day (1969)
- Samuel Taylor Coleridge (1972)

== Additional bibliography ==
- The English Mind: Studies in the English Moralists – Presented to Basil Willey by Hugh Sykes Davies and George Watson (1964)
- Spots of Time: A Retrospect of the Years 1897-1920 (First volume of autobiography)
