= Contact Theatre =

Theatre in Manchester, England

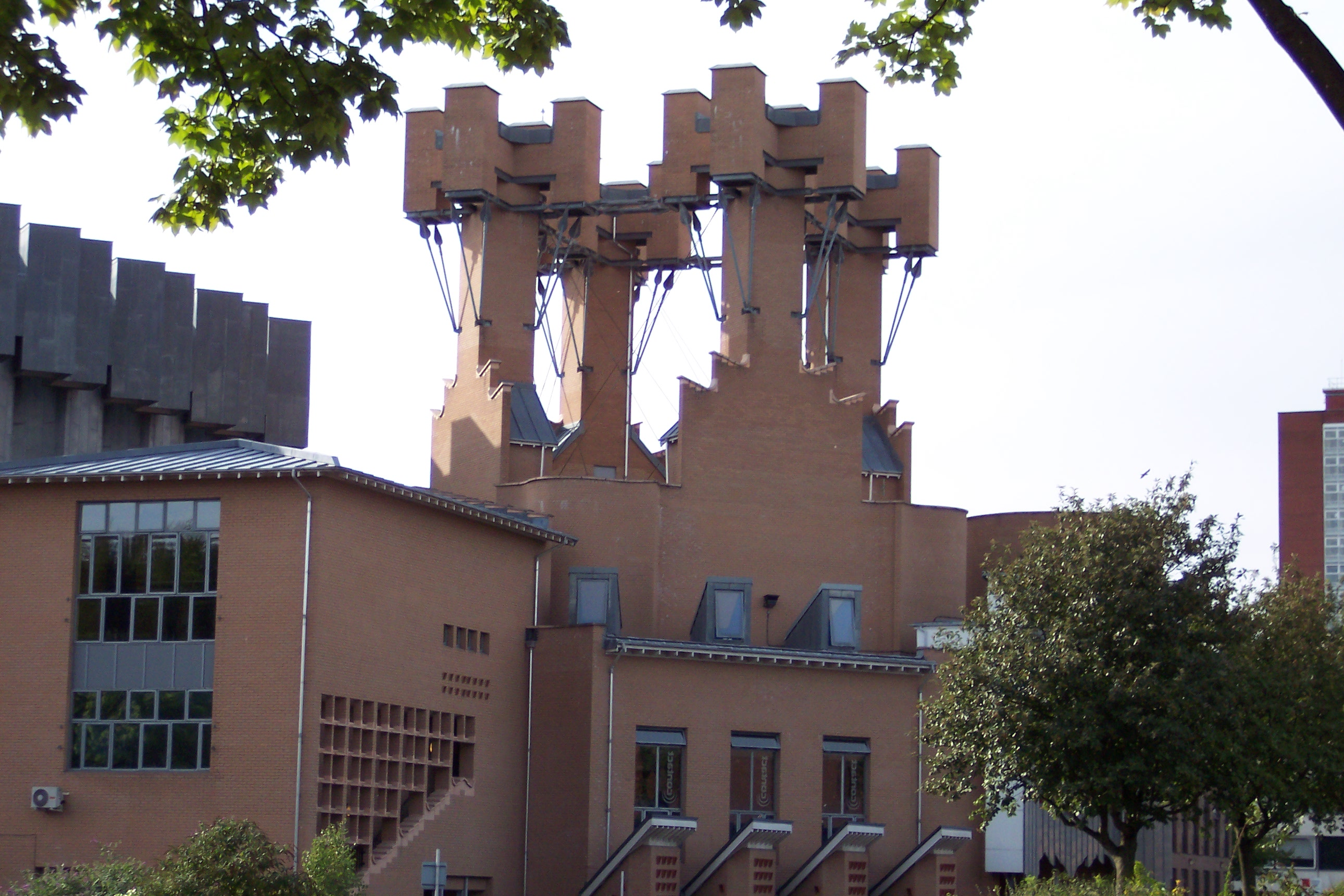
- Interactive map of Contact Theatre
- Address: Oxford Rd, Manchester M15 6JA, UK; Manchester, England; United Kingdom
- Coordinates: 53°27′47″N 2°13′55″W
- Capacity: Space 1: 320 seats; Space 2: 80 seats
- Type: Theatre

Construction
- Opened: 1972
- Renovated: 1999, 2021
- Architect: C. Alan Short

Website
- contactmcr.com

Contact is an arts organisation based in Manchester, England. Established in 1972, as a center for young artists to create and learn, the theatre remains in its original building and is a part of the Arts Council England, the University of Manchester, the Manchester City Council, and the Association of Greater Manchester Authorities..

== History ==
Contact was founded in 1972 by Barry Sheppard (General Manager of what was then Manchester University Theatre) and Hugh Hunt (Professor of Drama), as Manchester Young People's Theatre as part of the University of Manchester.

In 1999, following a £5 million investment from Arts Council England, Contact was redesigned and opened as an arts venue for young people. It is funded by Arts Council England, the Association of Greater Manchester Authorities, Manchester City Council, and the University of Manchester, but it is independently managed.

Apart from traditional theatre, it features dance, music, poetry, spoken word, hip-hop and art. Its program includes touring work along with in-house productions, which are developed through partnerships featuring young artists.

Contact is a registered charity.

=== Programs ===
In 2002, Contact began hosting a series named Contacting The World. This is a biannual international project that allows young people from around the world to create new theatre projects, and culminates in a Festival Week in July.

Contacting The World has featured companies from Malaysia, Trinidad, Nigeria, Rwanda, Palestine, Brazil, Poland, India, Sri Lanka, Pakistan, Jordan, Bangladesh, Syria, Iran, South Africa, New Zealand, The Philippines, Nepal, Zambia, Germany, Turkey, the UK and USA.

== Architecture ==
Contact's distinctive building was designed by architect Alan Short and Associates as part of the venue's 1999 redesign. Arts Council England contributed £4.5 million toward the building, with matched funding from English Partnerships and land donated by the University of Manchester. In 2022, the theatre was renovated by Sheppard Robson, to improve energy efficiency and update the grounds while preserving the original design.

It is located on Devas Street, Chorlton-on-Medlock, near the university's School of Education and Department of Drama. The main 320-seat auditorium (Space 1) was refitted and an 80-seat studio (Space 2) was added in the newly built turret.

== Leadership & Artistic directors ==
- Paul Clements (founding artistic director)
- John McGrath 1999–2008
- Baba Israel 2009–2012
- Matt Fenton 2013–2022
- Keisha Thompson 2022-2024
- Jack Dale-Dowd 2023-present

== Awards ==
- Stirling Royal Institute of British Architects Building Of The Year (1999)
- Arts Council Breakthrough Award: In Recognition of the Pioneering work achieved with Young People
- TMA Eclipse Award for Cultural Diversity
- Arts Council England Art04 Outstanding Achievement Award
- Arts Council England Art07 Rising Star
- TMA Award for Diversity 2013
- Co-operative RESPECT Inclusive Venue of the Year 2013
- Lever Prize Winner 2014
