= Clare Hall, Cambridge =

College of the University of Cambridge

Clare Hall
- University of Cambridge
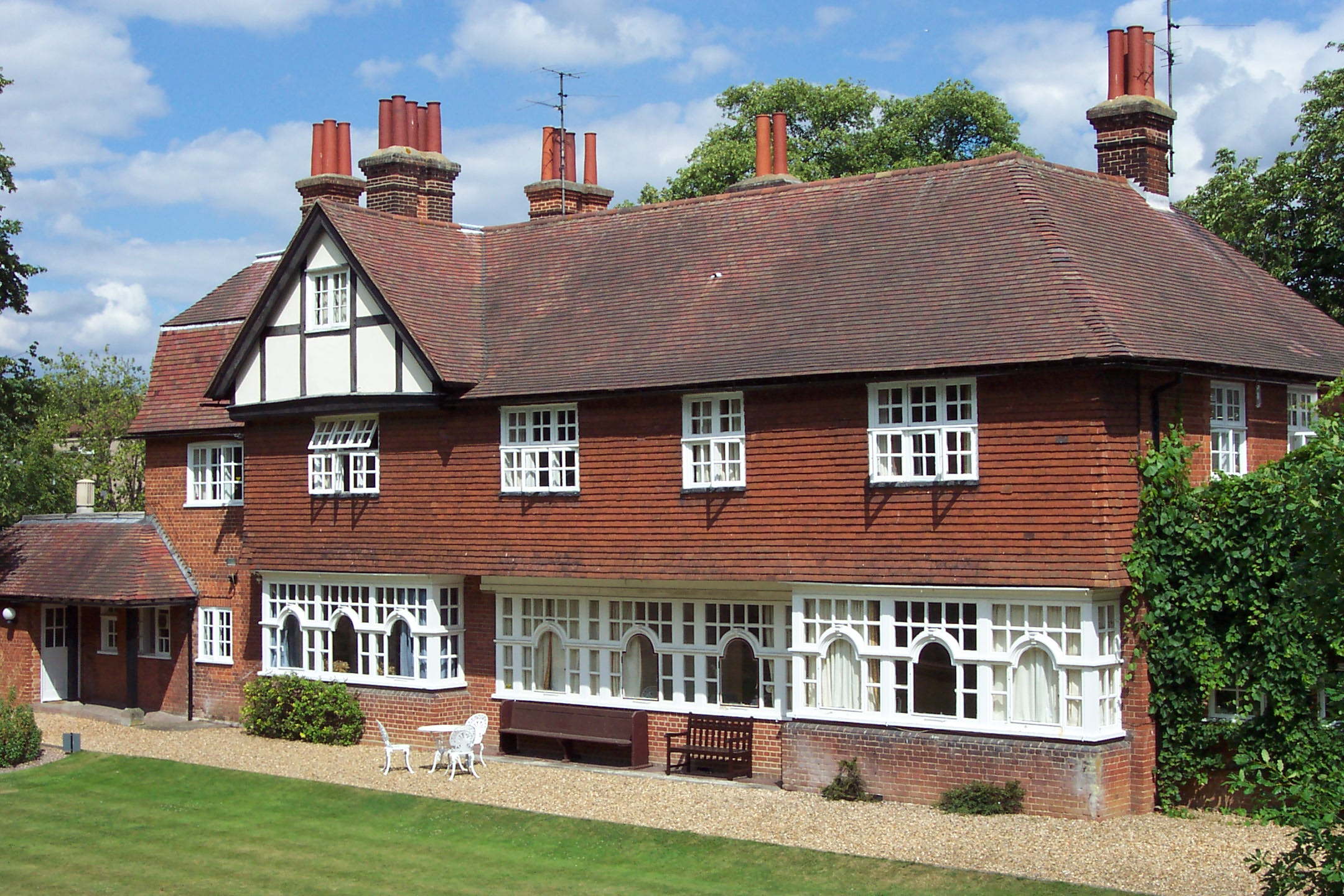

- Arms: Chevronny Or and Gules on a chief Sable five goutties three and two Argent
Scarf colours: black, with two equally-spaced narrow stripes of red edged with yellow
- Location: Herschel Road (map)
- Coordinates: 52.2041°N 0.1045°E
- Abbreviation: CLH
- Established: 1966
- Named after: Clare College
- Sister college: St Cross College, Oxford
- President: C. Alan Short
- Undergraduates: None
- Postgraduates: 255 (2022-23)
- Endowment: £21m (2023)
- Visitor: Chancellors of the High Court ex officio
- Website: www.clarehall.cam.ac.uk
- GSB: www.clarehall.cam.ac.uk/graduate-student-body
- Boat club: Clare Hall Boat Club

Map
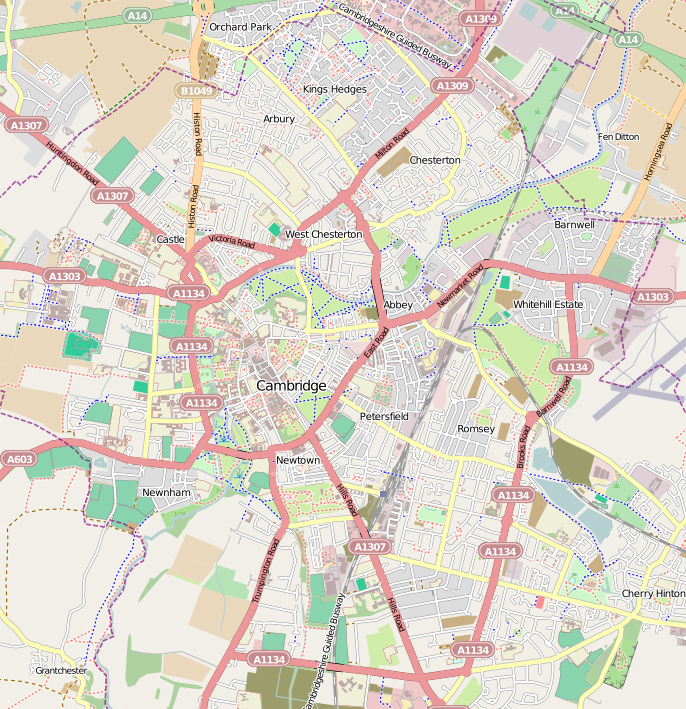
- Location within Cambridge

Clare Hall is a constituent college of the University of Cambridge. Founded in 1966 by Clare College, Clare Hall is a college for advanced study, admitting only postgraduate students alongside postdoctoral researchers and fellows. It was established to serve as an Institute of Advanced Studies and has slowly grown and developed into a full constituent college. It is a registered charity.

Clare Hall is one of the smallest colleges with around 250 graduate students, but around 125 fellows, making it the highest ratio of fellows to students at the University of Cambridge. Notwithstanding its small size, the college is also notable for its high number of Nobel laureate affiliates. Clare Hall maintains many Cambridge traditions, including formal halls and the tutorial system.

== History ==
Clare Hall was founded by Clare College (which had previously been known as "Clare Hall" from 1338 to 1856) as an Institute for Advanced Study. The intention was to become a social group of men and women, with accommodation for their families. The proposal was directed at graduate students studying for higher degrees in the university, research fellows working at post-doctoral level, permanent fellows holding faculty or research posts in the university, and visiting fellows on leave from universities around the world.

After Clare College decided to establish this new centre in January 1964, the initial planning was carried through by a small group of fellows of the college chaired by the Master, Sir Eric Ashby. It was soon agreed that the new centre would be called Clare Hall, the ancient name by which the college itself had been known for more than five hundred years until the mid-19th century. Clare Hall maintains close ties with Clare College, sharing some facilities and annual events.

The Institute of Advanced Studies at the University of Bologna is so far the only institution abroad explicitly modelled upon Clare Hall.

== Buildings ==
The architect Ralph Erskine was appointed to design the buildings for Clare Hall, which were to include common rooms, offices and dining facilities, a house for the president, and twenty apartments for visiting fellows. A neighbouring house, Elmside in Grange Road, provided rooms for the relatively small number of graduate students.

Sir Eric Ashby, then Master of Clare College and Vice-Chancellor of the University, formally opened Clare Hall in September 1969. Brian Pippard, the first president of Clare Hall, had already moved into the president's house with his family; twelve research students were living on the college site in Elmside and a number of visiting fellows with their families were living in the newly built college apartments.

Among the early visiting fellows was Ivar Giaever, who was awarded a Nobel Prize for Physics in 1973. Joseph Brodsky, a visiting fellow and poet in residence at Clare Hall in 1977, was awarded the Nobel Prize for Literature in 1987. William Nordhaus, a visiting fellow in 1970, was awarded the Nobel Prize for Economics in 2018.

Other facilities on the college grounds include a sports complex with a multi-gym, swimming pool and tennis court. It also has a dining room which is used for formal halls. The university athletics track is a short run from the main college buildings.

=== Growth ===
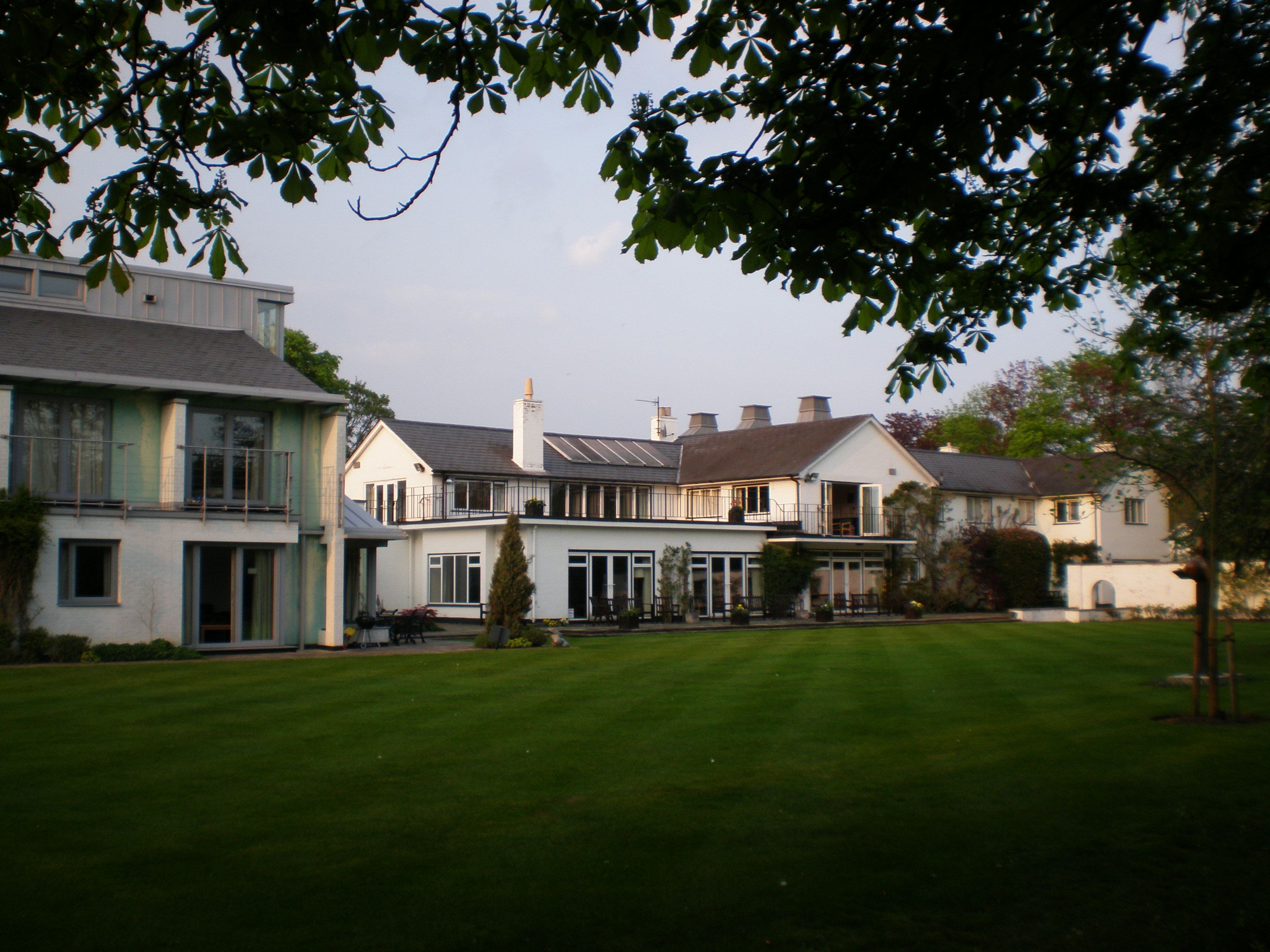
West Court, Clare Hall (formerly Lord Rothschild's family home)

In 1978 a second neighbouring house, now called Leslie Barnett House, was obtained for graduate student accommodation. This purchase also allowed the Michael Stoker and Brian Pippard Buildings to be built in the college grounds, providing further student rooms.

The Anthony Low Building in the garden of Elmside was completed in 2000, providing further common rooms and the Garden Bar for the graduates on the main college site.

In the summer of 1996, the college purchased a substantial property, formerly the Cambridge family home of Victor Rothschild, 3rd Baron Rothschild (1910–1990), which is about five minutes' walk from the college at the western end of Herschel Road. It was renamed Clare Hall West Court and, after conversion and some major building works, now provides public rooms, studies, apartments, study bedrooms, a fitness centre and a swimming pool.

== Student life ==
Unlike other colleges in the university, Clare Hall does not have a High Table at meals or a Senior Common Room, and it is a single society for all social functions and in the use of the various college common rooms and other facilities. This encourages interaction between graduate students, distinguished visiting fellows and other senior members, aided also by the wide variety of national backgrounds and research interests of the members.

The interaction between members of Clare Hall is encouraged also by college seminars, lunchtime discussions and formal lecture series. The latter includes the annual series of lectures relating to human values, given by a distinguished international scholar and sponsored by the Tanner Foundation. They also include the annual Ashby lecture, given by a visiting fellow, and the more frequent ASH seminar (arts, social sciences and history) that were initiated by some of the visiting life members.

Other events include art exhibitions, films and small concerts which supplement the wealth of music available in the university.

== People associated with the college ==
=== Presidents ===
The president's term of office is fixed at seven years. Previous presidents include Brian Pippard (1966–73), Robert Honeycombe, Goldsmiths Professor and head of the Department of Metallurgy (1973–80); Sir Michael Stoker (1980–87), former director of the Imperial Cancer Research Laboratories; Anthony Low (1987–94), professor of Commonwealth history and formerly vice-chancellor of the Australian National University; Dame Gillian Beer (1994–2001), King Edward VII Professor of English Literature; Ekhard Salje (2001–08), head of the Department of Earth Sciences; Sir Martin Harris (2008–13), former vice-chancellor of the University of Manchester; and David Ibbetson, Regius Professor of Civil Law.

Professor C. Alan Short became the ninth president of Clare Hall from 1 August 2020. He is the professor of architecture of the University of Cambridge.

=== Fellows ===
The late Lord Ashby was elected as the first honorary fellow of Clare Hall in 1975, on his retirement from the Mastership of Clare College.

Present honorary fellows include two former visiting fellows, Kim Dae-Jung, former president of the Republic of Korea and Nobel Peace Prize winner in 2000, and Lee Bollinger, who later became president of the University of Michigan and Columbia University. They also include the retired presidents of the college, together with Ralph Erskine, architect of the early buildings, and Richard Eden, one of the founding fellows.

Clare Hall has a strong tradition in theoretical physics. Brian Pippard, its first president, was Cavendish Professor of Physics. Notable current fellows include Michael Green, former Lucasian Professor of Mathematics; John D. Barrow, a Templeton Prize laureate; and Stephen Toope, vice-chancellor of the university from 2017. Notable past fellows include David J. Thouless, winner of a 2016 Nobel Prize in Physics; Ivar Giaever, winner of a 1973 Nobel Prize in Physics; Stephen Adler, permanent faculty at the Institute for Advanced Study; Michael R. Douglas of Stony Brook University; J. David Jackson of the University of California, Berkeley. Other American academics who were past fellows include Andreas Acrivos (fluid dynamics) of Stanford, Leila Ahmed (divinity) of Harvard, David Epel (marine biology) of Stanford.

=== Notable alumni and past fellows ===
- Paul Berg, 1980 Nobel laureate in Chemistry
- Betty Behrens, Historian
- Joseph Brodsky, 1987 Nobel laureate in Literature
- José Wendell Capili, Filipino writer
- Michele Chiaruzzi, Sammarinese ambassador
- Jeff Colyer, Governor of Kansas
- Kim Dae-jung, former president of South Korea, 2000 Nobel laureate in Peace
- Ivar Giaever, 1973 Nobel laureate in Physics
- Tamala Krishna Goswami, Hindu theologian
- Seamus Heaney, 1995 Nobel laureate in Literature
- Tobias Hecht, American anthropologist
- Howard Markel, American historian of medicine and physician
- William Nordhaus, 2018 Nobel laureate in Economics
- Barbara Sahakian, professor of clinical neuropsychology
- Phyllis Starkey, former Labour Party MP
- Budiman Sudjatmiko, Indonesian activist and politician
- David J. Thouless, 2016 Nobel laureate in Physics
- Michael Toch, Professor of medieval history

== See also ==
- Clare Hall Boat Club
- Listed buildings in Cambridge (west)
