= Nicholas Mansergh =

Anglo-Irish historian (1910–1991)

Philip Nicholas Seton Mansergh OBE (27 June 1910 – 16 January 1991) was an Anglo-Irish historian. His focus was on Ireland and the British Commonwealth. He was Master of St John's College, Cambridge (1969-1979). He was chair of British Commonwealth relations at Chatham House (1945-1953). Then in 1953 the Smuts Professor of Commonwealth History at Cambridge University, where he trained many of the specialists in the field of Irish, Indian, and Commonwealth studies. He played the central role in assembling and editing the "monumental" 12-volume edition of historical documents associated with the independence of India.

== Early life and education ==
Nicholas Mansergh was born on 27 June 1910 at Greenane House in County Tipperary, Ireland. He maintained lifelong ties there. He was the second son of Philip St George Mansergh (1863–1928), a railway engineer, and Ethel Marguerite Otway Louise Mansergh (1876–1963). His Anglo-Irish forefathers were part of the Protestant Ascendancy and arrived in Ireland from England in the 17th century with Oliver Cromwell.

One of Mansergh's earliest memories was of trains leaving the town carrying soldiers destined for service on the Western Front in the First World War. After a short period at school in the north, Mansergh attended the Erasmus Smith (Abbey) School in Templemore in his native Tipperary, which was founded in 1760. He was the youngest boy there when the school suddenly closed in 1922; he also attended The Abbey School, Tipperary. After the Irish Civil War, Mansergh attended St. Columba's College, Dublin with his elder brother, then he went up to Pembroke College, Oxford to read modern history. There he came under the influence of R. B. McCallum and was later supervised by W. G. S. Adams. He gained a Second in 1932.

== Career ==
After graduation, Mansergh was a tutor in the school of Modern Greats at the University of Oxford and secretary to the Oxford Union Politics Research Committee. His first book, The Irish Free State: Its Government and Politics (1934), fuelled his subsequent interest in the Commonwealth, one that he would pursue for the remainder of his academic career. In an interview a half century later, Mansergh noted:

The Commonwealth for my generation had something in common with the Common Market nowadays. I was interested in the Commonwealth to see if it would provide a way forward in Ireland itself. An inherent weakness in the Anglo-Irish Treaty was that the Dominion settlement was not consistent with Partition [from Northern Ireland]. I felt that Dominion status wouldn't work, which was obvious enough by 1934, but I wasn't sure whether any alternative to Dominion status would work in Ireland's case.

Mansergh followed this up in 1940 with Ireland in the Age of Reform and Revolution, which critically analysed the Marxist dialectic as it had been applied to Ireland, noting later that this led to his frequent misidentification as a Marxist historian. During the Second World War, Mansergh worked in the British Ministry of Information, where after working on Anglo-Irish information services and cultural relations he was appointed head of the Empire division in 1944. He was made an Officer of the Order of the British Empire in the 1946 New Year Honours.

After the war, Mansergh was appointed Abe Bailey Professor of British Commonwealth relations at Chatham House (1945-1953). He also began visiting India as an observer at the Asian Relations Conference. Upon his return, Mansergh gave a lecture on "The Implications of Éire's Relations with the British Commonwealth of Nations", which helped influence Commonwealth relations during the late 1940s.

In 1953 Mansergh was appointed to the newly created position of Smuts Professor of the History of the British Commonwealth at Cambridge University. There he supervised several research students studying Irish history and he ran a special subject on the Anglo-Irish settlement which was taken by numerous students reading for Part II of the Historical Tripos. W. K. Hancock states:

"In the departments of history in nearly every British university Ireland had remained for too long a forgotten country, except as an irritating intruder into British party politics. Cambridge had been in some degree an exception to that bad rule.. But Mansergh was the first member of the faculty to make specific provisions for the teaching of Irish history both to undergraduates and graduates.... For as far ahead as anybody can foresee, Mansergh's contribution to Irish historiography will remain an enlightening and civilized influence upon intelligent teachers, students and men of affairs both in Ireland and in Britain."

In 1967 he was appointed editor-in-chief by the prime minister, Harold Wilson, of a multi-volume collection of documents from the India Office on the transfer of power to India in the 1940s. Two years later, he published one of his most important works, The Commonwealth Experience, and was elected Master of St John's College, Cambridge (1969-1979). In 1971 he was made an honorary fellow of Trinity College Dublin. He served as Master until 1979, and continued there afterwards as a fellow, and he was also three times Visiting Professor at the Indian School of International Studies in New Delhi.

Historian Margaret O'Callaghan said "Nicholas Mansergh...was one of the finest historians of high political relations between successive British governments and those of the two parts of the island of Ireland." He was a member of the British Academy, where the obituary by David Harkness praised his distinguished work. A festschrift from his students honoured his memory.

== Personal life ==
In December 1939 at St. Mary the Virgin Church, Oxford University, Nicholas Mansergh married Diana Mary Keeton (1919–2001), the daughter of George Keeton of Fleet, Hampshire, an English public school headmaster and former England Rugby international. Diana Keeton had studied languages at Lady Margaret Hall, Oxford and was a women's squash and lawn tennis blue. Nicholas Mansergh was himself a former Irish senior men's tennis champion and met Keeton on an Oxford tennis court. She later edited two collections of his papers after her husband's death in 1991. She died in 2001. They had 5 children (Philip, Daphne, Martin, Nicholas and Jane). Martin was an Irish politician and historian. Daphne Gilbert (her married name) became a mathematician.

== Legacy ==
A travel bursary at St. Columba's, his old school, was donated by him.

== Published works ==
- The Irish Free State: Its Government and Politics. George Allen & Unwin. 1934.
- The Government of Northern Ireland: A Study in Devolution. George Allen & Unwin. 1936.
- Ireland in the Age of Reform and Revolution. George Allen & Unwin. 1940. (New & revised edition published as The Irish Question, 1840–1921, 1965, 1975 ISBN 978-0-04-901022-2)
- Survey of British Commonwealth Affairs: Problems of External Policy 1931-39. Oxford University Press. 1952.
- Documents and Speeches on Commonwealth Affairs, 1952–1962. London: Oxford University Press. 1963. Archived from the original on 27 December 2013 – via Questia.
- The Commonwealth Experience. Weidenfeld and Nicolson. 1969. ISBN 9780297170716. (revised 1982)
- Constitutional Relations between Britain and India: The Transfer of Power, 1942-7. 1967–82. (Editor-in-chief, 12 volumes)
  - Mansergh, Nicholas, and E. W. R. Lumby, eds. India: The Transfer of Power 1942-7. Vol. II. 'Quit India' 30 April-21 September 1942 (London: Her Majesty's Stationery Office, 1971), 1044pp online Volumes are available from the Internet Archive
- The Unresolved Question: The Anglo-Irish Settlement and its Undoing 1912–72. Yale University Press. 1991. ISBN 0-300-05069-0.
- Diana Mansergh, ed. (1997). Nationalism and Independence: Selected Irish Papers by Nicolas Mansergh. Cork University Press. ISBN 1-859-18105-8.
- Diana Mansergh, ed. (2000). Independence Years: The Selected Indian and Commonwealth Papers of Nicholas Mansergh. Oxford University Press. ISBN 0-195-64847-1.

== Tributes ==
St John's College awards an annual Mansergh Prize in his honour to the best short dissertation or essay (under 10,000 words) on history.

Academic offices
New title	Smuts Professor of Commonwealth History, University of Cambridge; 1953–1970	Succeeded by Eric Thomas Stokes
Preceded by John Boys Smith	Master of St John's College, Cambridge; 1969–1979	Succeeded by Harry Hinsley
