= Lionel Charles Knights =

English literary critic (1906–1997)

Lionel Charles Knights (15 May 1906 – 8 March 1997) was an English literary critic, an authority on Shakespeare and his period. His essay How Many Children Had Lady Macbeth? (1933) is a classic of modern criticism. He became King Edward VII Professor of English Literature at the University of Cambridge in 1965.

== Early life ==
He was born in Grantham and initially attended The King's School in the town, followed by Hutchesons' Grammar School, Glasgow, and Cambridgeshire High School for Boys. He was educated at Selwyn College, Cambridge, where he read History and English, graduating with a first-class degree in 1928. In his final undergraduate year he won the Charles Oldham Shakespeare prize, shared with Humphrey Jennings. He was elected to a research scholarship at Christ's College, Cambridge in 1930, where he worked on his doctoral thesis.

== Literary career ==
He was a co-editor of Scrutiny, the literary journal of F. R. Leavis's school, from May 15, 1932, to 1953 when it ceased publication.

He was an English lecturer at the University of Manchester in 1933, then Professor of English Literature at the University of Sheffield in 1947 and the Winterstoke Professor of English at University of Bristol in 1953. From 1965 to 1973, he was King Edward VII Professor of English Literature at the University of Cambridge.

== Personal life ==
He married Elizabeth Barnes in 1936. They had a son, Benjamin, and a daughter, Frances. Knights died in Durham in 1997.

== Works ==
- How Many Children Had Lady Macbeth. An Essay in the Theory and Practice of Shakespeare Criticism (1933)
- Drama & Society in the Age of Jonson (1937)
- Explorations: Essays in Criticism Mainly On the Literature of the Seventeenth Century (1946)
- Poetry, Politics and the English Tradition (1954)
- Some Shakespearean Themes (1959)
- An Approach to 'Hamlet' (1960)
- Shakespeare: The Histories (1962)
- Further Explorations (1965)
- Public Voices: Literature and Politics With Special Reference to the Seventeenth Century (1971)
- Coleridge's Variety: Bicentennial Studies (1974), editor with John Beer
- Explorations 3: Essays in Criticism (1976)
- Selected Essays in Criticism (1981)
- Regulated Hatred and Other Essays on Jane Austen, with D. W. Harding and Monica Lawlor
