= David Trotter (academic) =

British academic and medievalist (1951-)

Wilfred David Trotter, FBA (born 25 July 1951) is a British academic specialising in the literature and cinema of 20th century Britain.

Trotter was Quain Professor of English Language and Literature at University College London from 1991 to 2002, and then the King Edward VII Professor of English Literature at the University of Cambridge and a fellow of Gonville and Caius College from 2002 to 2018.

== Honours ==
In 2004, Trotter was elected Fellow of the British Academy (FBA).

Academic offices
Preceded by Dame Gillian Beer	King Edward VII Professor of English Literature; University of Cambridge; 2002 to 2018	Succeeded by Clair Wills
