= Megan Vaughan =

British historian and academic

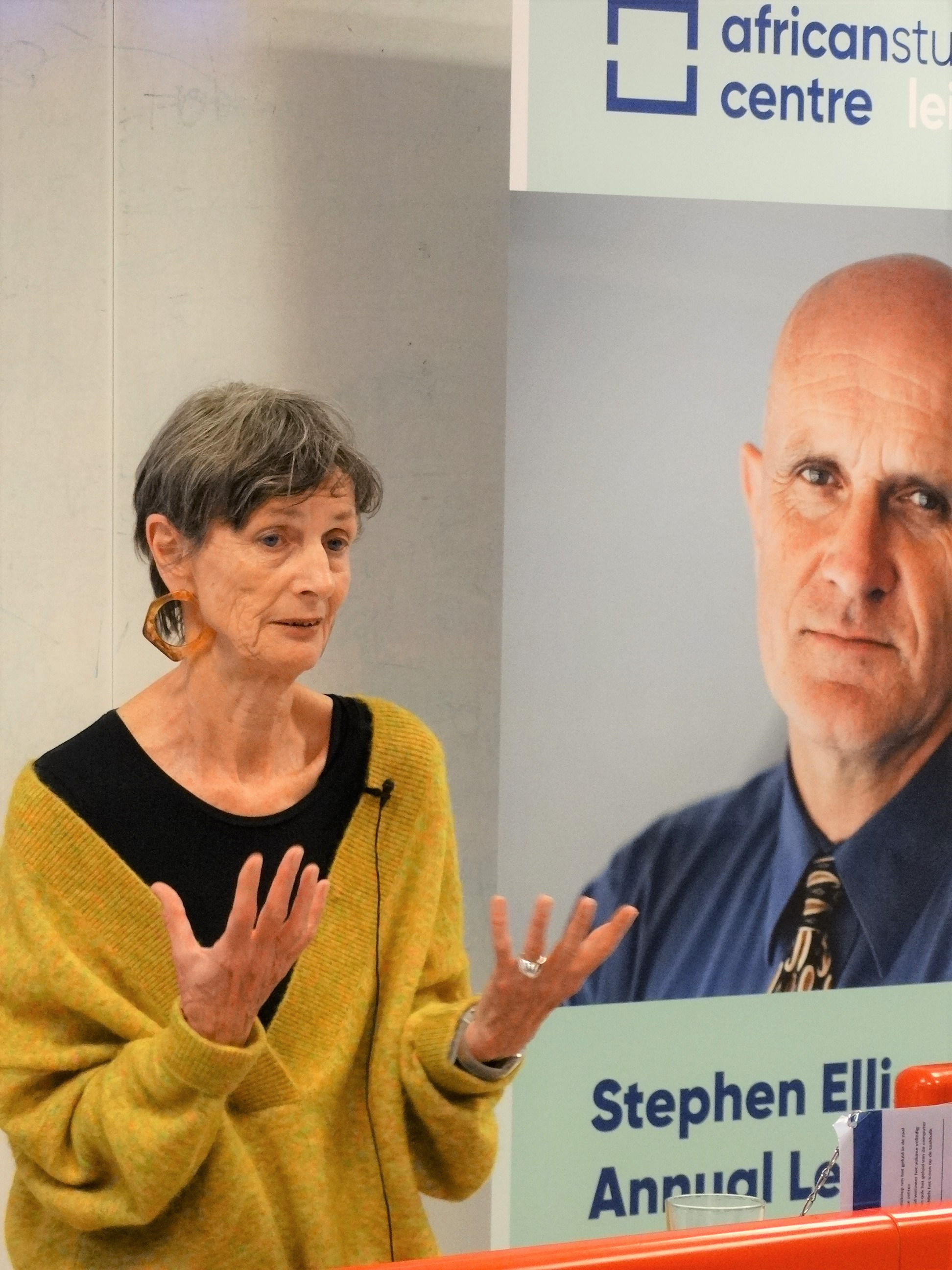
- Vaughan giving the 2022 Stephen Ellis lecture "Africa in the time of Coronavirus - Biology, history and politics", African Studies Centre Leiden, 1 December 2022
- Occupation: Professor
- Employer: University College London University of Cambridge
- Notable work: Women Farmers of Malawi: Food Production in the Zomba District (1984; with David Hirschmann); Cutting Down Trees: Gender, Nutrition, and Agricultural Change in the Northern Province of Zambia, 1890-1990 (1995; with Henrietta Moore); Creating the Creole Island: Slavery in Eighteenth-century Mauritius (2006)
- Awards: Herskovits Prize; Heggoy Prize for French Colonial History
- Honours: Honorary Doctor of Letters (DLitt) degree by the University of Kent

Megan Vaughan, FBA, FRHistS is a British historian and academic, who specialises in the history of East and Central Africa. Since October 2015, she has been Professor of African History and Health at the Institute of Advanced Studies, University College London. From 2002 to 2016, she was Smuts Professor of Commonwealth History at the University of Cambridge.

== Honours ==
In 1995, Vaughan and Henrietta Moore were awarded the Herskovits Prize by the African Studies Association for their book Cutting Down Trees: Gender, Nutrition, and Agricultural Change in the Northern Province of Zambia, 1890-1990. In 2006, Vaughan was awarded the Heggoy Prize for French Colonial History by the French Colonial Historical Society for her book Creating the Creole Island: Slavery in Eighteenth-century Mauritius.

In 2002, Vaughan was elected a Fellow of the British Academy, the United Kingdom's national academy for the humanities and social sciences. On 17 July 2015, she was awarded an honorary Doctor of Letters (DLitt) degree by the University of Kent "in recognition of her contribution to the study of world history".

== Selected works ==
- Hirschmann, David; Vaughan, Megan (1984). Women Farmers of Malawi: Food Production in the Zomba District. Berkeley, CA: Institute of International Studies, University of California, Berkeley. ISBN 978-0877251583.
- Vaughan, Megan (1987). The story of an African famine: gender and famine in twentieth-century Malawi. Cambridge: Cambridge University Press. ISBN 978-0521329170.
- Vaughan, Megan (1991). Curing their ills: colonial power and African illness. Cambridge: Polity Press. ISBN 978-0745607801.
- Moore, Henrietta L.; Vaughan, Megan (1994). Cutting down trees: gender, nutrition, and agricultural change in the northern province of Zambia, 1890-1990. Portsmouth: Heinemann. ISBN 978-0435080884.
- Vaughan, Megan (2005). Creating the Creole island: slavery in eighteenth-century Mauritius. Durham, N.C.: Duke University Press. ISBN 978-0822334026.
- Mahone, Sloan; Vaughan, Megan, eds. (2007). Psychiatry and Empire. Basingstoke: Palgrave Macmillan. ISBN 978-1403947116.
- Kalusa, Walima T.; Vaughan, Megan (2013). Death, Belief and Politics in Central African History. Lusaka, Zambia: Lembani Trust. ISBN 978-9982680011.
