= A. G. Hopkins =

British historian (born 1938)

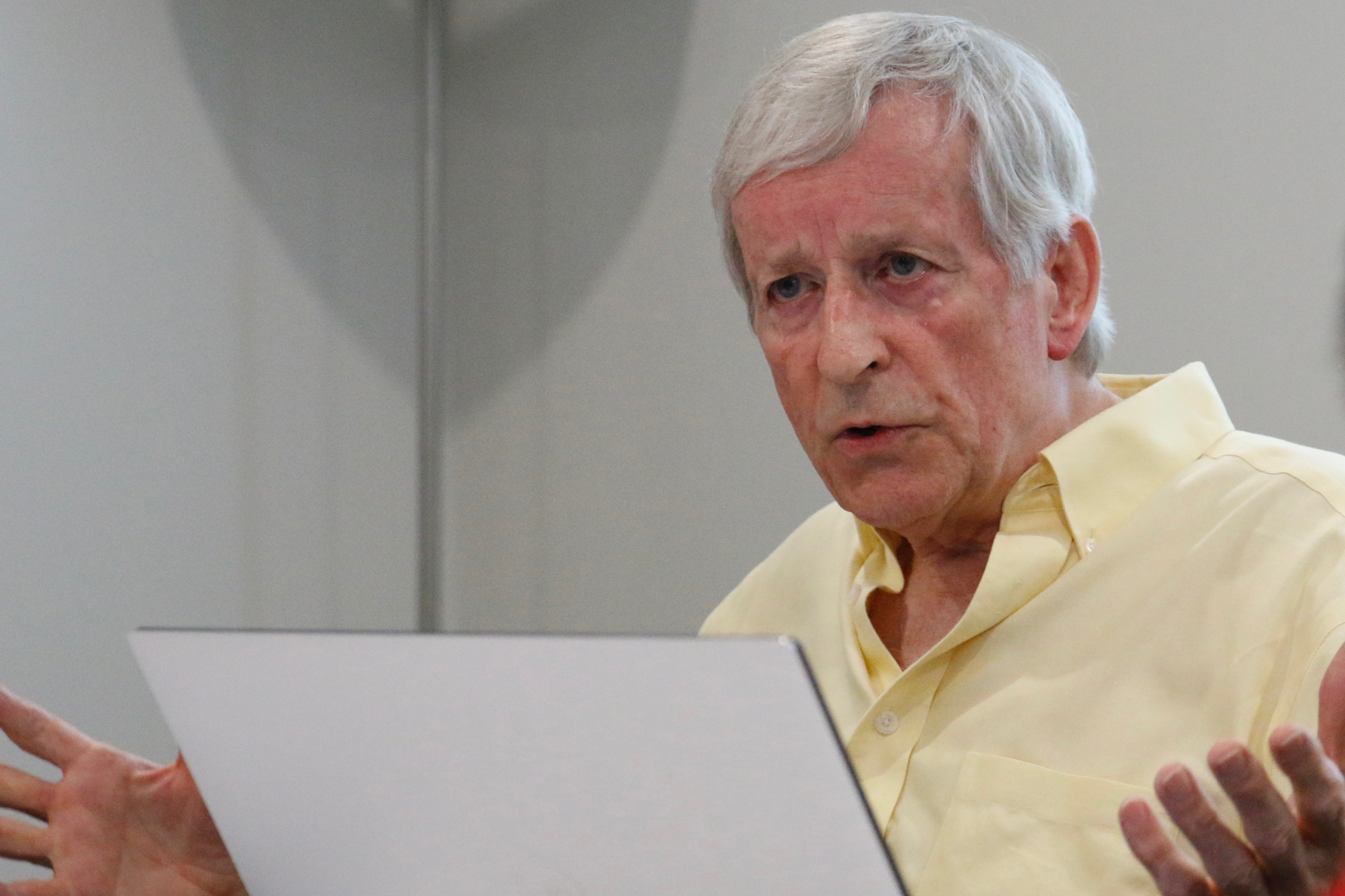
Tony Hopkins presents to the Stellenbosch Institute for Advanced Study, February 2020.

Antony Gerald Hopkins, FBA (born 21 February 1938) is a British historian specialising in the economic history of Africa, European colonialism, and globalisation. He is Emeritus Smuts Professor of Commonwealth History at the University of Cambridge, an Emeritus Fellow of Pembroke College, Cambridge and a fellow of the British Academy.

== Career ==
Antony Gerald Hopkins was born on 21 February 1938, the son of George Henry Hopkins and his wife, Queenie Ethel née Knight. Following schooling at St Paul's School between 1953 and 1957, he completed a Bachelor of Arts degree in History at the University of London, graduating in 1960. He then completed a PhD at the School of Oriental and African Studies (1964), with a thesis entitled "An Economic History of Lagos, 1880–1914".

After completing his doctorate, Hopkins was employed as an Assistant Lecturer at the University of Birmingham; he was subsequently a Lecturer and then a Reader there, before his appointment in 1977 as a Professor of Economic History on the University's faculty. In 1988, he moved over to the Graduate Institute of International Studies in Geneva to be Professor of History, an appointment which lasted until 1994, when he became Smuts Professor of Commonwealth History at the University of Cambridge. From 2002 to 2013 he held the Walter Prescott Webb Chair of History at the University of Texas at Austin, where he won the University 'Eyes of Texas' Teaching Award, and the College of Liberal Arts Student Council Teaching Award.

He received honorary doctorates from the University of Stirling (D. Univ.) in 1996 and the University of Birmingham (D. Litt.) in 2013. He was elected a Fellow of the British Academy in 1996. In 2011, former students and colleagues presented him with a book of essays, edited by Toyin Falola and Emily Brownell, entitled Africa, Empire and Globalization: Essays in Honor of A. G. Hopkins (Carolina Academic Press, Durham, NC).

Hopkins is known for his extensive work on the history of Africa, empires, and globalisation. He has been an editor of both the Journal of African History and the Economic History Review. His principal works include An Economic History of West Africa (1973), and, with Peter Cain, British Imperialism, 1688–2000 (1993), which won the Forkosch Prize awarded by the American Historical Association in 1995 and is considered to be one of the most influential interpretations of the British Empire proposed in the last half century. He has also published a study of the United States from an imperial perspective, entitled American Empire: A Global History (2018); a detailed history of Nigerian Entrepreneurs, Capitalism in the Colonies: African Merchants in Lagos, 1851-1931 (2024); and The Land Where Nothing Works: How Britain Lost the Plot (Princeton University Press, 2026).

== Selected bibliography ==
=== Books ===
- An Economic History of West Africa (1973; 2nd ed. 2020).
- (with P. J. Cain) British Imperialism, 1688-2015 (1st ed. published in two volumes in 1993; 2nd ed. in one volume, 2001; 3rd ed. in one volume, Routledge, 2016).
- (as editor) Globalization in World History (2002).
- (as editor) Global History: Interactions Between the Universal and the Local (2006).
- American Empire: A Global History (Princeton University Press, 2018).
- An Economic History of West Africa (2nd Ed. Routledge, 2019).
- Africa, Empire, and World Disorder: Historical Essays (Routledge, 2020).
- Capitalism in the Colonies: African Merchants in Lagos, 1851–1931 (Princeton University Press, 2024).
- The Land Where Nothing Works: How Britain Lost the Plot (Princeton University Press, 2026).

=== Articles and book chapters ===
- ‘Macmillan’s Audit of Empire, 1957’, in Peter Clarke and Clive Trebilcock, eds., Understanding Decline: Perceptions and Realities; Essays in Honour of Barry Supple (Cambridge, 1997), pp. 234–60.
- (with P. J. Cain), ‘The Theory and Practice of Imperialism’, in Raymond E. Dumett, ed. Gentlemanly Capitalism and British Imperialism: the New Debate on Empire (Longman, 1999), pp. 196–220.
- ‘Development and the Utopian Ideal, 1960-1999’, in Robin Winks and Alaine Low, eds., The Oxford History of the British Empire, Vol. 5 (Oxford, 1999), pp. 635–52.
- 'Back to the Future: From National History to Imperial History', Past and Present, 164 (1999), pp. 198–243.
- ‘Quasi-States, Weak States and the Partition of Africa’, Review of International Studies, Vol. 26, No. 2 (Apr., 2000), pp. 311–320.
- ‘Asante and the Historians: Transition and Partition on the Gold Coast’, in Roy Bridges, ed. Imperialism, Decolonisation and Africa: Historical Essays in Honour of John Hargreaves (2000), pp. 25–64.
- (with P.J. Cain), ‘The Peculiarities of British Capitalism: Imperialism and World Development’, in Shigeru Akita, ed., Gentlemanly Capitalism, Imperialism, and Global History (2002), pp. 207–55.
- ‘Gentlemanly Capitalism in New Zealand’, Australian Economic History Review, (43) 2003, pp. 289–99.
- ‘Towards a Cosmopolitan History of Imperialism’, in Olivier Petre-Grenouilleau, From Slave Trade to Empire: Europe and the Colonisation of Black Africa, 1780s-1880s (2004), pp. 231–43.
- ‘Making Poverty History’, International Journal of African Historical Studies, 38 (2005), pp. 513–31.
- ‘"Crooked Like a Stick in Water": A Fractured Autobiography’, in Wm. Roger Louis, ed., Burnt Orange Britannia (2005), pp. 245–65.
- ‘The “Victory Strategy”: Grand Bargain or Grand Illusion?’, Current History, 105 (2006), pp.14-19.
- ‘Capitalism, Nationalism and the New American Empire', Journal of Imperial and Commonwealth History, Vol. 35, No. 1 (2007), pp. 95-117.
- ‘Comparing British and American Empires’, Journal of Global History, 2 (2007), pp. 395–404.
- 'Rethinking Decolonization', Past and Present, 200 (2008), pp. 211–47.
- 'Explorers’ Tales: Stanley Presumes – Again', Journal of Imperial and Commonwealth History, Vol. 36, No. 4 (2008), pp. 669–684.
- 'The New Economic History of Africa', Journal of African History, 50 (2009), pp. 155–77.
- 'A Lagos Merchant and his Money: I. B. Williams, 1846-1925', in Toyin Falola, ed. Empire and Slavery in the Atlantic World: Essays in Honor of Robin Law (2008), pp. 201–19.
- 'The Historiography of Globalization and the Globalization of Regionalism', Journal of the Economic & Social History of the Orient, 53 (2010), pp. 19–36.
- 'The United States, 1783-1861: Britain's Honorary Dominion?', Britain and the World, 4 (2011), pp. 232–46.
- 'Causes and Confusions in African History', Economic History of Developing Regions, 26 (2011), pp. 107–10.
- 'The Real American Empire', in James Belich, John Darwin and Christopher Wickham, eds. The Prospect of Global History (Oxford, 2015), pp. 146–59.
- 'Globalisation and Decolonisation', Journal of Imperial & Commonwealth History, 45 (2017).
- 'Is Globalisation Yesterday's News?', Itinerario, 41 (2017), pp. 109–28.
- 'Kut Losses', History Today, 68 (2018), pp. 34–45.
- 'American Empire in the Nineteenth Century', in Shigeru Akita, ed. Beyond the Great Divergence: Reconsidering the Nineteenth Century from Asian Perspectives (Mineruva-shobo, Kyoto, 2018), pp. 33–52.
- 'Fifty Years of African Economic History', Economic History of Developing Regions, 34 (2019), pp. 1–15.
- 'Response' to Roundtable Review of A. G. Hopkins, American Empire: A Global History, H-Diplo, XX-33 (April 2019).
- 'How I Got from There to Here', H-Diplo Essay on Learning the Scholar's Craft, H-Diplo, 190 (February 2020).
- 'Response' to Roundtable Review of A. G. Hopkins, An Economic History of West Africa (2nd ed.), H-Diplo, XXI-46 (June 2020).
- 'Response' to Contributions to a Symposium on American Empire: A Global History, Journal of Imperial & Commonwealth History, 49 (2021), pp. 607–25.
- 'The Philippines in Imperial History', Journal of Imperial & Commonwealth History, 49 (2021), pp. 805-25.
- 'The United States After 1783: An American or a British Empire?' Asian Review of World Histories, 10 (2022), pp. 202-18.
- 'Ethical Capitalism?', Journal of Imperial and Commonwealth History, 52 (2024), pp. 558-64.
