= C. Alan Short =

British architect and academic

Charles Alan Short (born 1955) is a British architect and academic.

Short was educated at Trinity College, Cambridge, where he achieved an MA degree and a DipArch. He has been Professor of Architecture at the University of Cambridge since 2001, and President of Clare Hall, Cambridge since 2020. He champions low-energy buildings that will be resilient to climate change.

== Selected buildings designed by Short ==
- Queens Building De Montfort University, Leicester (1993)
- Contact Theatre, Manchester (1999)
- Lanchester Library, Coventry (2000)
- Lichfield Garrick Theatre, Lichfield (2003)
- UCL School of Slavonic and East European Studies, London (2004)

== Bibliography ==
- Short, C. A.; Lomas, K. J.; Woods, A. (1 May 2004). "Design strategy for low-energy ventilation and cooling within an urban heat island". Building Research & Information. 32 (3): 187–206. doi:10.1080/09613210410001679875. ISSN 0961-3218. S2CID 110633758.
- Short, C. Alan (1 March 2008). "What is 'architectural design research'?". Building Research & Information. 36 (2): 195–199. doi:10.1080/09613210701811015. ISSN 0961-3218. S2CID 218591052.
- Short, C. Alan; Al-Maiyah, Sura (1 June 2009). "Design strategy for low-energy ventilation and cooling of hospitals". Building Research & Information. 37 (3): 264–292. doi:10.1080/09613210902885156. ISSN 0961-3218. S2CID 108698801.
- Giridharan, R.; Lomas, K. J.; Short, C. A.; Fair, A. J. (1 November 2013). "Performance of hospital spaces in summer: A case study of a 'Nucleus'-type hospital in the UK Midlands". Energy and Buildings. 66: 315–328. doi:10.1016/j.enbuild.2013.07.001. hdl:20.500.11820/d1cc7e59-8fbc-479e-ac04-57680cbaaee9. ISSN 0378-7788.
- Short, C. Alan (2017). The recovery of natural environments in architecture : air, comfort and climate. London. ISBN 978-0-415-82440-8. OCLC 952567241.

Academic offices
Preceded by David John Ibbetson	President of Clare Hall, Cambridge; 2020–Present	Succeeded by Incumbent
