= Gillian Beer =

British literary critic and academic

Dame Gillian Beer DBE

Personal details
- Born: Gillian Patricia Kempster Thomas; 27 January 1935 (age 91) Surrey, England

5th President of Clare Hall, Cambridge
- In office 1994–2001
- Preceded by: Anthony Low
- Succeeded by: Ekhard Salje

Dame Gillian Patricia Kempster Beer, DBE FBA (née Thomas; born 27 January 1935) is a British literary critic and academic. She was President of Clare Hall from 1994 to 2001, and King Edward VII Professor of English Literature at the University of Cambridge from 1994 to 2002.

== Early life ==
Born Gillian Patricia Kempster Thomas in Surrey, England, Beer studied English Literature at St Anne's College, Oxford. At Oxford, she was a friend of fellow student John Carey and dated Del Kolve, both of whom became notable academics.

== Academic career ==
Following teaching posts at Bedford College, London, and the University of Liverpool, she was a fellow of Girton College, Cambridge, for 30 years. She was later King Edward VII Professor of English Literature at Cambridge, and later president of Clare Hall, the University of Cambridge's distinctive, international postgraduate college. She served as chair of the judges for the Booker Prize in 1997.

Her most intensive literary criticism lies in the field of Victorian studies. Darwin's Plots (1983), in particular, related the form of Victorian novels to Darwinist thinking. Its significance as a work was confirmed by the publication of a second edition by Cambridge University Press in 2000 and a third edition in 2009. She has also written important collections of essays on Virginia Woolf (The Common Ground, 1996) and on other aspects of the relations of literature, science, and other academic disciplines.

== Honours and awards ==
- She was elected a Fellow of the British Academy in 1991
- Dame Commander of the Order of the British Empire (1998)
- Foreign Honorary Member of the American Academy of Arts and Sciences (2001)
- Oxford University awarded her an Honorary Doctor of Letters (June 2005)
- She was elected a Fellow of the Royal Society of Literature in 2006
- She was elected to the American Philosophical Society in 2010
- Harvard University awarded her an Honorary Doctor of Letters (May 2012)
- Truman Capote Award for Literary Criticism for Alice in Space: The Sideways Victorian World of Lewis Carroll (October 2017)
- Ghent University awarded her an Honorary Doctorate on the recommendation of the Faculty of Arts and Philosophy. (March 2018)
- She was awarded an Honorary Doctorate of Literature in 2019 by the University of Chichester.

== Family ==
She married the literary critic John Beer in September 1962; they have three sons.

== Literary criticism ==
- Meredith: A Change of Masks (1970)
- Darwin's Plots (1983)
- George Eliot (1986)
- Arguing with the Past (1989)
- Open Fields (1996)
- Virginia Woolf: The Common Ground (1996)
- Alice in Space: The Sideways Victorian World of Lewis Carroll (2016)

== Bibliography ==
A full bibliography of Gillian Beer's work may be found in:

- Literature, Science, Psychoanalysis, 1830–1970: essays in honour of Gillian Beer (Helen Small, Trudi Tate, editors), Oxford University Press, 2003)

== Sources ==
- MacLeod, Donald. "Dame Gillian Beer", The Guardian (29 June 2004).

Awards and achievements
Preceded by Hilary Spurling	Rose Mary Crawshay Prize; 1967 and Christine Alexander	Succeeded by Caroline Franklin
Academic offices
Preceded by Marilyn Butler	King Edward VII Professor of English Literature; University of Cambridge; 1994 to 2002	Succeeded by David Trotter
Preceded by Anthony Low	President of Clare Hall, Cambridge; 1994-2001	Succeeded by Ekhard Salje
