= William Soone =

British jurist and cartographer; (fl. 1545–1575)

William Soone or Zoone (fl. 1540–1575) was an English jurist and cartographer.

== Life ==
Soone was educated at Cambridge University, where he matriculated at Michaelhouse in 1544. He graduated with a B.A. in 1547, and proceeded with his M.A. at another date after 1549. He became the doctor of civil and canon laws at some university on the continent. The bursars' accounts of Caius College show that he was a resident at Gonville Hall, probably as a fellow, from 1548 to 1555. In 1561 he became regius professor of civil law, and in June of that year was admitted fellow of Trinity Hall.

He would not conform to the Church of England, and, leaving Cambridge, he went abroad. His successor in the professorship – William Clerke, was appointed in 1563. Soone is said to have resided at Paris, Dol, Freiburg, and Padua, and to have been a professor of law for some time at Leuven. From Leuven he went, most likely, to Antwerp, where he acted as assistant to Abraham Ortelius.

In 1572, he was at Cologne. He then passed to Rome, and had some papal appointment.

== Works ==
In Cologne, he published 'Gulielmi Sooni Vantesdeni Auditor sive Pomponius Mela disputator de Situ Orbis'. Part of this rare book, the 'Novi incolæ orbis terrarum,’ is copied from Arnold Mylius and published by Ortelius in the 1570 edition of the 'Theatrum.' Accordingly, Ortelius complained, and Soone offered explanations dated from Cologne, 31 August 1572.

Soone also copied the map of Cambridge which Richard Lyne had drawn for John Caius's 'History of the university' (1574), and published his copy in Georg Braun and Hogenberg's 'Civitates Orbis terrarum' (1575?). Along with this map, there was a description of the university.
