= David Ibbetson =

British legal historian and academic

David Ibbetson FBA

8th President of Clare Hall, Cambridge
- In office August 2013 – August 2020
- Preceded by: Sir Martin Harris
- Succeeded by: C. Alan Short

Regius Professor of Civil Law University of Cambridge
- In office 2000–2022
- Preceded by: David Eric Lothian Johnston
- Succeeded by: Helen Scott

Personal details
- Born: David John Ibbetson
- Citizenship: United Kingdom
- Education: Corpus Christi College, Cambridge
- Awards: Fellow of the British Academy (2003)

David John Ibbetson FBA is a British legal historian and academic who served as Regius Professor of Civil Law at the University of Cambridge from 2000 to 2022, and President of Clare Hall, Cambridge from 2013 to 2020. A specialist in English legal history and Roman law, he is known for his work on the historical relationship between English Common Law and European legal systems.

Ibbetson spent twenty years at Magdalen College, Oxford as a Fellow and Tutor in Law. He was elected Fellow of the British Academy in 2003. During his time at Cambridge, he served as chairman of the Faculty of Law (2009-2012) and General Editor of the Cambridge Law Journal (2003-2009).

== Biography ==
David Ibbetson obtained his MA and PhD in Law at Corpus Christi College, Cambridge, the latter supervised by Professor Sir John Baker. In 1980, he became a Fellow and Tutor in Law at Magdalen College, Oxford. He returned to Corpus Christi in 2000, following his appointment as Regius Professor of Civil Law at the Faculty of Law in the University of Cambridge. He was elected to the British Academy in 2003. In 2004, he became Warden of Leckhampton House, the College's site for postgraduate students. In August 2013, Ibbetson left Corpus Christi College when he became the eighth President of Clare Hall, Cambridge, succeeding Sir Martin Harris. He was succeeded by Alan Short as head of Clare Hall in August 2020.

Ibbetson is originally and primarily an English legal historian, but he is also expert in Roman law and has written comparative works relating to the history of European law. Whilst he has published on a wide range of subjects, his focus has been on the historical relationship between English Common Law and the legal systems and legal thought of the rest of Europe.

== Bibliography ==
- Oxford International Encyclopedia of Legal History [editor] (2009)
- Sir William Jones, Essay on the Law of Bailments [editor] (2007)
- Common Law and Ius Commune (Selden Society) (2001)
- A Historical Introduction to the Law of Obligations (1999)
- The Roman Law Tradition [editor] (1994)

Academic offices
Preceded by David Eric Lothian Johnston	Regius Professor of Civil Law; August 2000–present	Incumbent
Preceded by Sir Martin Harris	President of Clare Hall, Cambridge; August 2013–August 2020	Succeeded by C. Alan Short
