= King Edward VII Professor of English Literature =

Professorship at the University of Cambridge

The King Edward VII Professorship of English Literature is one of the senior professorships in literature at the University of Cambridge, and was founded by a donation from Sir Harold Harmsworth in 1910 in memory of King Edward VII who had died earlier that year.

== King Edward VII Professors ==
- Arthur Woollgar Verrall (1911)
- Arthur Thomas Quiller-Couch (1912–1944)
- Basil Willey (1946)
- Lionel Charles Knights (1965)
- John Frank Kermode (1974)
- Christopher Bruce Ricks (1982)
- Marilyn Butler (1986)
- Gillian Patricia Kempster Beer (1994)
- David Trotter (2002)
- Clair Wills (2019)
