= Lichfield Garrick Theatre =

Theatre in Lichfield, England

Lichfield Garrick
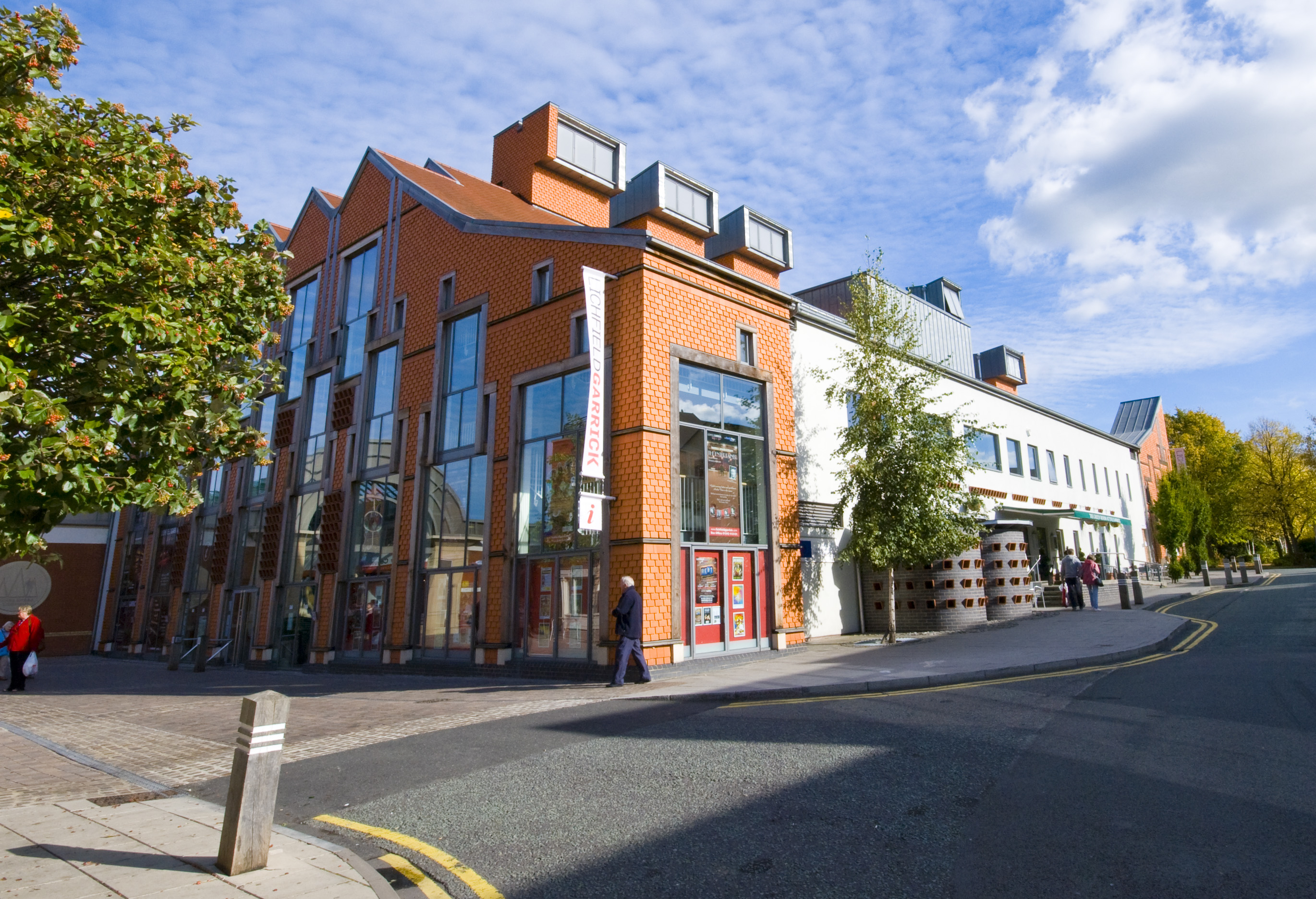
- Interactive map of Lichfield Garrick
- Address: Castle Dyke; Lichfield, Staffordshire WS13 6HR
- Coordinates: 52.682414°N 1.826238°W
- Owner: Lichfield District Council leased to Lichfield Garrick Theatre Ltd
- Capacity: 562 seats
- Type: Regional theatre
- Production: Lichfield Garrick Production Company, Lichfield Garrick Young Rep

Construction
- Opened: 1 July 2003
- Years active: 22
- Architects: Short and Associates

Website
- www.lichfieldgarrick.com

The Lichfield Garrick is a modern, purpose-built theatre in Lichfield, a city in Staffordshire, England.

The main auditorium seats 562 people and the Studio seats 157 people. The theatre is named after the 18th century actor David Garrick, who was brought up in Lichfield.

The Garrick's programme includes a variety of touring shows as well as its own productions. It is also used for plays and musicals by local amateur companies. Like most British theatres the Garrick also plays host to an annual Christmas pantomime.

The Lichfield Garrick regularly produces and co-produces work, runs an Artist Development programme and a Community Engagement programme that engages with local schools and arts organisations throughout the year. The theatre also runs weekly programmes including the Young Garrick Weekly Youth Theatre.

The Lichfield Garrick is operated as a charitable theatre trust and is independent of Lichfield District Council, although the Council invests in the theatre as its principal partner.

The Artistic Director & Chief Executive is Daniel Buckroyd. The board of trustees is chaired by David Hill.

The theatre has won several awards, including Excellence in Sales & Marketing Award at the Greater Birmingham Chambers of Commerce (2025), Small Budget Impact/Best Use of Data at the Midlands Marketing Awards (2024), and Best Large Business Award at the Beacon Awards (2023 & 2024). It also won the UK Theatre Award for the West Midlands' Most Welcoming Theatre (2017) and the What's On Readers' Award for Staffordshire's Best Arts Venue (2018 - 2020).

== History ==
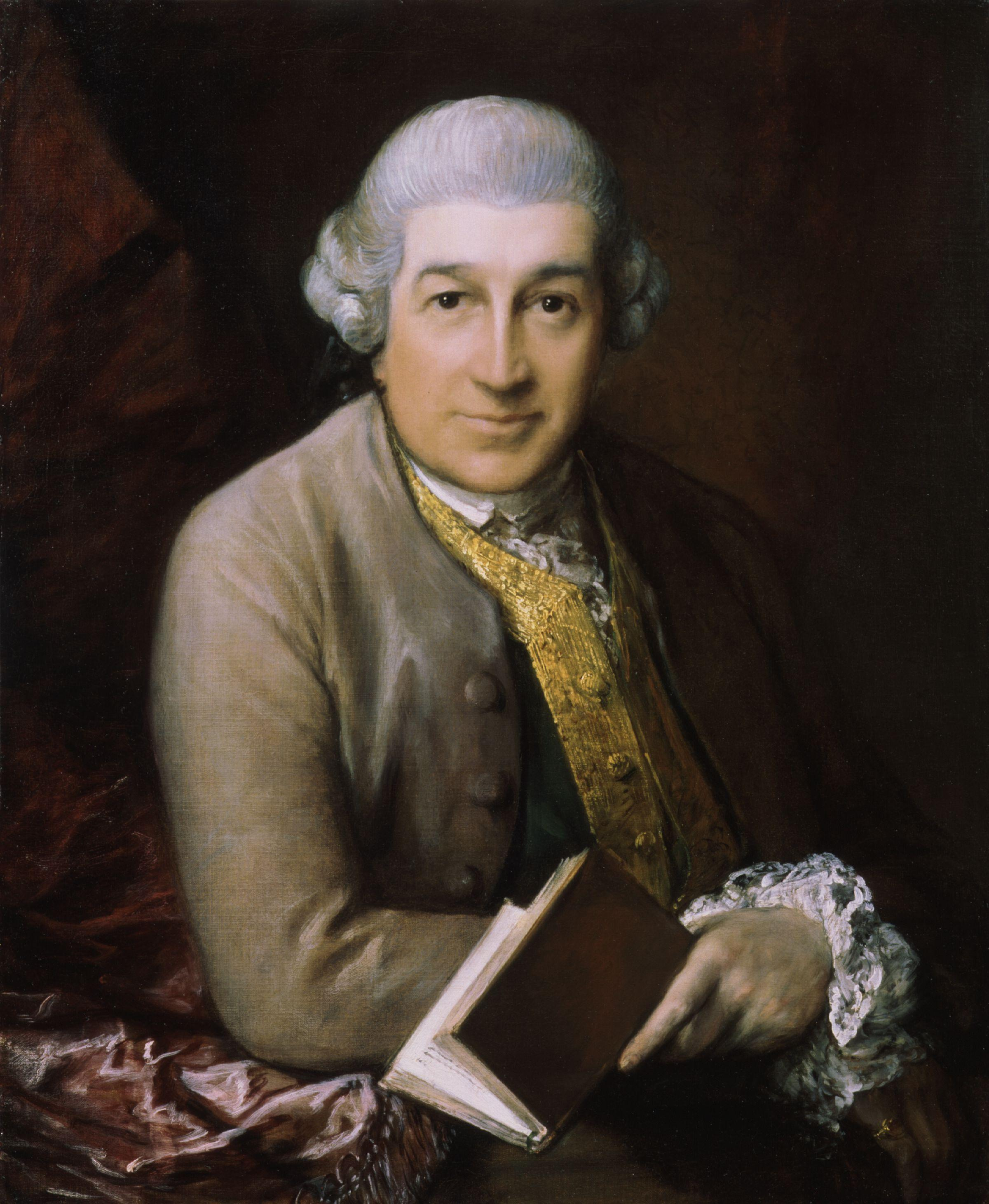
The theatre is named after David Garrick who grew up in the city. Depicted here in the 1770 Portrait of David Garrick by Thomas Gainsborough.

The new £5.5 million theatre opened in July 2003 replacing the old Arts centre and Civic Hall. The project received over £1.4 million from the European Structural Funds Program. The architect was Alan Short, founder of Short & Associates. As well as adding a fly tower and orchestra pit to the main auditorium, the theatre was remodelled, so that new front of house areas could be built, better backstage access provided and a studio theatre included. It is architecturally notable for its unique natural ventilation system, which is an eco-friendly design. In 2004 it won the Green Apple Award for Environmental Best Practice and CIBSE Project of the Year, among others. However, the building received a mixed response from the public, with some people arguing the theatre's design was not in keeping with the character of Lichfield.

The first production, The Recruiting Officer, was directed by and starred Corin Redgrave. George Farquhar is said to have written some of the play while staying at the George Hotel in Lichfield. It was also the first play that David Garrick performed in.

== Garrick Rep Company ==
The Garrick Rep Company was formed in 2005 with the aim of providing theatre goers with powerful and exciting performances, produced in-house at the Garrick Theatre. Early productions were presented under the name of RDC Productions.

Year	Play	Cast	Director	Notes
2006	Bouncers	Tom Roberts, Mark Jardine, Simon Naylor, Andrew Dickinson	Alice Bartlett & Simon West	
2006	April in Paris	Tom Roberts, Sarah Kirkland	Alice Bartlett	
2006	Frankenstein	Tom Roberts, Sarah Kirkland, Rob Glyn-Jones	Alice Bartlett	
2007	Waiting for Godot	Mark Jardine, Russell Richardson, Phil Yarrow, Steve Edwin	Alice Bartlett	
2007	Satin 'n' Steel	Tom Roberts, Rebecca Reaney	Alice Bartlett	
2007	Look Back in Anger	Ben Warwick, Emily Bowker, Giles Faulkner, Lydia Bewley, Robert Austin	Adam Barnard	
2007	A Midsummer Night's Dream	Ben Warwick, Emily Bowker, Giles Faulkner, Lydia Bewley	Adam Barnard	
2008	Cold Comfort Farm	Hannah Jayne Stretton, Edward Elks, Georgina Stamp, Alexander D'Andrea	Kim Gillespie	In association with The Lichfield Players
2008	Two	Mark Jardine, Janet Bamford	Alasdair Harvey & Rachael Pennell	
2008	Shirley Valentine	Beverly Hills	Alasdair Harvey & Rachael Pennell	
2008	Who's Afraid of Virginia Woolf?	Matthew Kelly, Tracey Childs, Mark Farrelly, Louise Kempton	Andrew Hall	Transferred to Trafalgar Studios, The West End
2009	Fur Coat and No Knickers	Sam Millard, Mark Grady, Richard Loosemore	Kim Gillespie	In association with The Lichfield Players
2009	Ladies' Day	Joanna Bacon, Lorraine Cheshire, Abigail Longstaffe, Sean McKenzie, Liz Simmons	Alasdair Harvey	
2009	The Entertainer	John Ashton, Gerry Hinks, Lin Blakley, Emily Pennant-Rea, Robert Pass	Andrew Hall	
2010	Brassed Off	Matthew Stathers, Rachel Matthews, Charlie Buckland, Janet Bamford	Chris Rolls	In association with The Lichfield Players
2010	The Blue Room	Ty Glaser, Robert Curtis	Alasdair Harvey	
2010	Haunting Julia	Christopher Timothy, Richard O'Callaghan, Dominic Hecht	Andrew Hall	This production was repeated in 2011 and transferred to Riverside Studios, London
2011	On the Razzle	Darren Beaumont, Joe Morrow, Tom McCarron, Lindsey Carr	Alice Bartlett	In association with The Lichfield Players
2013	Educating Rita	Tom Roberts, Tupele Dorgu	Gareth Tudor Price	
