= David Eric Lothian Johnston =

Scottish legal expert (born 1961)

David Eric Lothian Johnston KC (born 1961) is a Scottish legal expert, currently Honorary Professor of Law at the University of Edinburgh.

== Career ==
Johnston was an undergraduate at Christ's College, Cambridge. He obtained a B.A. in 1982, a M.A. and Ph.D. in 1986 and an LL.D. in 2001 at the St John's College, Cambridge. 1985/86 he spent time as visiting scholar at the German institute for legal history in Freiburg. He was appointed Junior Research Fellow at Christ's College, Cambridge between 1985 and 1989, after which he moved into legal practice, concentrating on public law, in particular, human rights, and commercial law. 1987 he also acted as visiting fellow of Michigan Law School. 1992 he spent in legal practice. He was involved in the litigation arising from the Lockerbie bombing. From 1993 to 1999 he returned to academia as Regius Professor of Civil Law and Fellow of Christ's College at the University of Cambridge. Specializing in Roman law, Scottish law and the history of law, he is the author of four books. In 1996 and 1998 he taught as senior visiting fellow at University of California at Berkeley Law School and 1999 a visiting professorship at the Université de Paris I.

In 2000, he resumed legal practice in Edinburgh and reduced his teaching activities to an honorary professorship at the University of Edinburgh Law School. He held a visiting professorship at Osaka University Graduate Law School in 2000 and 2000 to 2003 in Paris. 2005, he was appointed King's Counsel. He was elected a Fellow of the Royal Society of Edinburgh in 2016.

== Selected writings ==
- On a Singular Book of Cervidius Scaevola (1987)
- The Roman Law of Trusts, Cambridge University Press (1988)
- Roman Law in Context, Oxford University Press (1999)
- Prescription and Limitation (1999)
