= Regius Professor of Civil Law (Cambridge) =

Professorial chair at Cambridge University

The Regius Professorship of Civil Law is one of the oldest and most prestigious of the professorships at the University of Cambridge.

The chair was founded by Henry VIII in 1540 with a stipend of £40 per year, and the holder is still chosen by the Crown.

== Regius Professors of Civil Law ==
- Thomas Smith (1540)
- Humphrey Busby (1547?)
- Walter Haddon (1551)
- William Soone (1561)
- William Clarke (1563)
- Thomas Legge (1570?)
- Thomas Bynge (1574)
- John Cowell (1594)
- Thomas Morrisson (1611)
- Thomas Goad (1635)
- John Clark (1666)
- John Boord (1673)
- John Oxenden (1684)
- Thomas Ayloffe (1703)
- Francis Dickins (1714)
- Henry Monson (1755)
- William Ridlington (1757)
- Samuel Hallifax (1770)
- Joseph Jowett (1782)
- James William Geldart (1814)
- Henry James Sumner Maine (1847)
- John Thomas Abdy (1854)
- Edwin Charles Clark (1873)
- William Warwick Buckland (1914)
- Patrick William Duff (1945)
- Peter Gonville Stein (1968)
- David Eric Lothian Johnston (1993)
- David John Ibbetson (2000)
- Helen Scott (2022)

== Official coat of arms ==
According to a grant of 1590, the office of Regius Professor of "lawe" at Cambridge has a coat of arms with the following blazon:

Coat of arms of Regius Professor of Civil Law
Crest On a wreath "purple and gold," a bee volant or. Escutcheon Purpure, a cross moline or, on a chief gules, a lion passant guardant of the second, charged on the side with the letter L sable.
