= Anthony Low =

British historian (1927–2015)

D.A. Low AO, FAHA, FASSA, FRHistS
- Born: Donald Anthony Low; 22 June 1927; British India
- Died: 12 February 2015 (aged 87); Canberra, Australian Capital Territory
- Education: Oxford University
- Known for: Study of decolonization
- Partner: Belle
- Scientific career
- Fields: Historian (British Commonwealth)
- Workplaces: University of Sussex; Australian National University; University of Cambridge

4th President of Clare Hall, Cambridge
- In office 1987–1994
- Preceded by: Sir Michael Stoker
- Succeeded by: Dame Gillian Beer

Donald Anthony Low AO FAHA FASSA (22 June 1927 – 12 February 2015), known as Anthony Low or D. A. Low, was a historian of modern South Asia, Africa, the British Commonwealth, and, especially, decolonization. He was the emeritus Smuts Professor of History of the British Commonwealth at the University of Cambridge, former Vice-Chancellor of the Australian National University, Canberra, and President of Clare Hall, Cambridge.

== Education ==
Low was born in 1927 and gained his doctorate from Oxford University.

== Career highlights ==
The academic positions which Professor Low has held include the following:

- Founding Dean of the School of African and Asian Studies, University of Sussex, 1968–1971
- Dean, Research School of Pacific and Asian Studies (RSPAS), Australian National University, 1973–1974
- Vice Chancellor, Australian National University, Canberra, 1975–1982
- Smuts Professor of the History of the British Commonwealth, University of Cambridge, 1983–1994
- President, Clare Hall, University of Cambridge, 1987–1994

== Fellowships ==
- Fellow of the Australian Academy of the Humanities (FAHA)
- Fellow of the Academy of the Social Sciences in Australia (FASSA)
- Fellow of the Royal Historical Society (FRHistS)
- Honorary Fellow of Exeter College, Oxford.

== Selected bibliography ==
=== Books ===
- Low, D.A. (1962). Political parties in Uganda 1949-62 (1st ed.). London: Institute of Commonwealth Studies, University of London, Athlone Press.
- Low, D.A., ed. (1968). Soundings in modern South Asian history. California: University of California Press.
- Low, D.A. (1973). Lion rampant; essays in the study of British imperialism. London: Cass. ISBN 9780714629865.
- Low, D.A., ed. (1988). The Indian National Congress: Centenary Hindsights. Delhi: Oxford University Press. ISBN 0195621425.
- Low, D.A. (1991). Eclipse of empire. Cambridge New York: Cambridge University Press. ISBN 9780521457545.
- Low, D.A. (1996). The egalitarian moment: Asia and Africa, 1950-1980. Cambridge New York: Cambridge University Press. ISBN 9780521567657.
- Low, D.A. (1997). Britain and Indian nationalism: the imprint of ambiguity, 1929-1942. Cambridge: Cambridge University Press. ISBN 9780521892612.
- Low, D.A. (2006). Congress and the Raj: facets of the Indian struggle, 1917-47 (2nd ed.). New Delhi Oxford: Oxford University Press. ISBN 9780195683677.
- Low, D.A. (2009). Fabrication of empire : the British and the Uganda kingdoms, 1890-1902. Cambridge, UK New York: Cambridge University Press. ISBN 9780521843515.

=== Chapters in books ===
- Low, D.A. (1988), "Congress and "mass contacts," 1936-1937: ideology, interests, and conflict over the basis of party representation", in Sisson, Richard; Wolpert, Stanley (eds.), Congress and Indian nationalism: the pre-independence phase, Berkeley: University of California Press, pp. 134–158, ISBN 9780520060418

Academic offices
| Preceded by Robert Williams | Vice-Chancellor of the Australian National University; 1975–1982 | Succeeded by Peter Karmel |
| Preceded by Eric Thomas Stokes | Smuts Professor of Commonwealth History Cambridge University; 1983–1994 | Succeeded by A.G. Hopkins |
| Preceded by Sir Michael Stoker | President of Clare Hall, Cambridge; 1987-1994 | Succeeded by Dame Gillian Beer |
