= Verdel Kolve =

American professor of English (1934–2022)

Verdel Amos Kolve (January 18, 1934 – November 5, 2022) was an American academic who was an honorary fellow at St Edmund Hall, University of Oxford and a professor of English.

== Life and career ==
Verdel was born in Wisconsin in 1934 to Amos and Gunda Kolve. He had a younger sister, Lois. Kolve gained his first degree at the University of Wisconsin, following which he went to Oxford University as a Rhodes Scholar in 1955, studying at Jesus College. He stayed on as a post graduate and was supervised by J. R. R. Tolkien.

In 1966 he published The Play Called Corpus Christi (London: Arnold) in which he looked at a range of mystery plays – drawn from the York Cycle, Chester Cycle, Towneley cycle and the misnamed "Coventry Cycle". In 1968 he was awarded a Guggenheim Fellowship.

Verdel died on November 5, 2022, at the age of 88.
