= Michael Stoker =

British physician and medical researcher

Professor Sir Michael Stoker CBE FRS FRSE FRCP
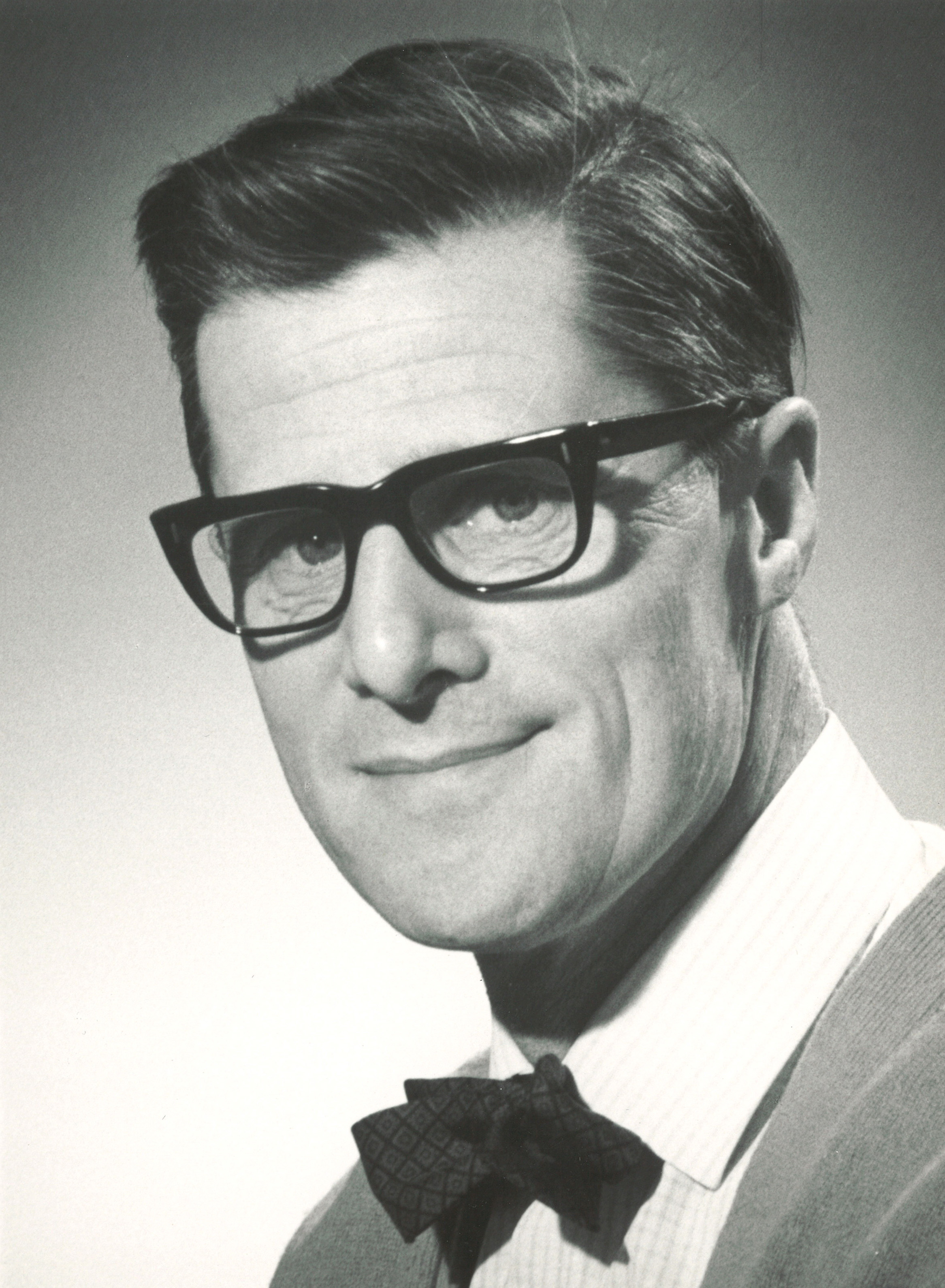
- Stoker in the 1960s

Personal details
- Born: 4 July 1918
- Died: 13 August 2013 (aged 95)
- Spouse: Veronica (died 2004)
- Children: 5
- Education: University of Cambridge

3rd President of Clare Hall, Cambridge
- In office 1980–1987
- Preceded by: Sir Robert Honeycombe
- Succeeded by: Anthony Low

Sir Michael George Parke Stoker (4 July 1918 – 13 August 2013) was a British physician and medical researcher in virology.

== Scientific career ==
Stoker studied medicine at Clare College, Cambridge and St Thomas' Hospital in London, gaining his MD in 1947, after serving in the Royal Army Medical Corps during World War II. On return to civilian life he became a Fellow of Clare College from 1948 and an assistant tutor and director of medical studies from 1949 to 1958. Between 1953 and 1956, he researched the structure of Coxiella burnetii, the bacteria causing Q fever, with Paul Fiset.

Stoker moved to Glasgow University in 1958. There he was the first professor of virology at the university (the first chair of virology to be established at a British university) from 1958 to 1968 and was appointed honorary director of the Medical Research Council Unit in 1959. He was the director of Imperial Cancer Research Fund Laboratories from 1968 to 1979 and president of Clare Hall, Cambridge University 1980–87.

He was elected a Fellow of the Royal Society in 1968 and delivered their Leeuwenhoek Lecture in 1971. He was made a CBE in 1974 and was knighted in the 1980 Birthday Honours.

== Personal life ==
Stoker was born in Taunton, UK. His father, born in Ireland, was a medical doctor. He attended Oakham School and then medicine at University of Cambridge. At the outbreak of the Second World War he was in training at St Thomas's Hospital, London. He enlisted in the Royal Army Medical Corps and was sent to India. He worked in Lucknow, Hydrabad and finally Pune. In Pune, he became involved in studying typhus and bush typhus which led to his life-long work in virology, since at the time it was thought that the Rickettsia that caused these diseases were a type of virus. In 1947 he returned to civilian life.

He married Veronica English (1919–2004) on 5 September 1942, whom he met as a fellow student at University of Cambridge. The couple had 5 children.

Academic offices
Preceded by Sir Robert Honeycombe	President of Clare Hall, Cambridge; 1980-1987	Succeeded by Anthony Low
