= Robert Honeycombe =

Australian academic (1921–2007)

Professor Sir Robert Honeycombe FRS FREng

Personal details
- Born: 2 May 1921
- Died: 14 September 2007 (aged 86)

2nd President of Clare Hall, Cambridge
- In office 1973–1980
- Preceded by: Sir Brian Pippard
- Succeeded by: Sir Michael Stoker

Sir Robert William Kerr Honeycombe (2 May 1921 – 14 September 2007) was an Australian academic. He was Goldsmiths' Professor of Metallurgy and Professor Emeritus of the University of Cambridge. He was an Honorary Fellow of Clare Hall, Cambridge. Born in Melbourne, Australia, Honeycombe was elected a Fellow of the Royal Society in March, 1981 and served on the council. He was knighted in 1990.

He was awarded the Beilby Medal and Prize in 1963.

Academic offices
Preceded by Sir Brian Pippard	President of Clare Hall, Cambridge; 1973–1980	Succeeded by Sir Michael Stoker
