= Richard J. Eden =

British theoretical physicist (1922–2021)

Richard John Eden OBE (2 July 1922 – 25 September 2021) was a British theoretical physicist who researched quantum field theory, nuclear theory and S-matrix theory in the 1950s and 1960s.

In 1974 he founded the Energy Research Group at the Cavendish Laboratory in Cambridge and from 1982 to 1989 was Professor of Energy Studies there. From 1974, he served on the UK Advisory Committee for Energy Conservation.

He was a founding Fellow of Clare Hall, Cambridge in 1966, and from 1987 to 1999 he was vice president of the college. After retirement he was made an Honorary Fellow.

== Career ==
Eden was born in London. He received his doctorate in 1951 at Cambridge University under Paul Dirac (The Classical and Quantum Mechanics of Non-holonomic Systems), and received the Smith's Prize in 1949.

In the 1950s, Eden was a leading British exponent of analytic S-matrix studies in elementary particle physics. From 1964 to 1982 he was Reader in Theoretical Physics at the University of Cambridge.

Also in the 1950s, he attended the Institute for Advanced Study in Princeton. This experience led him to develop ideas for a College for Advanced Study in Cambridge. He was subsequently a founding Fellow of Clare Hall, Cambridge in 1966, and from 1987 to 1999 he was vice president of the college.

On the occasion of the 10th anniversary of the founding of Clare Hall, Lord Ashby referred to him as the ‘Father of the Society’. This compliment is reprinted in publications marking the 40th and 50th anniversaries. Eden remained an Honorary Fellow.

In 1972, he took up interdisciplinary energy studies. In 1974 he founded the Energy Research Group at the Cavendish Laboratory. and from 1982 to 1989 was Professor of Energy Studies there. From 1974, he served on the UK Advisory Committee for Energy Conservation.

Malcolm Longair’s Scientific History of the Cavendish Laboratory states ‘there can be no doubt that Eden was ahead of his time in advocating the importance of physics-based interdisciplinary research for the benefit of society.'

Eden was awarded an OBE in 1978, and was a Fellow of the Institute of Physics. In 1970 he received the Maxwell Medal, and in 1989 the Open Award for Distinction in Energy Economics from the British Institute of Energy Economics (BIEE) in London.

His students included Michael Boris Green, John Clayton Taylor, Elliot Leader and Geoffrey C. Fox.

He died in Poole on 25 September 2021, at the age of 99.

== Publications ==
- Eden, R. J.; Francis, N. C. (1 March 1955). "Theory of Nuclear Models". Physical Review. 97 (5). American Physical Society (APS): 1366–1379. doi:10.1103/physrev.97.1366. ISSN 0031-899X.
- Eden, Richard J. (1 September 1960). "Analytic Structure of Collision Amplitudes in Perturbation Theory" (PDF). Physical Review. 119 (5). American Physical Society (APS): 1763–1783. doi:10.1103/physrev.119.1763. ISSN 0031-899X.
- (with Peter Landshoff, David Olive, John Polkinghorne The Analytic S-Matrix, Cambridge University Press, 1966, 2002 ISBN 978-0-5215-2336-3
- High Energy Collisions of Elementary Particles, Cambridge University Press, 1967 ISBN 978-0-5212-9030-2
- Eden, Richard J. (1 August 1970). "Pomeranchuk Theorem and the Serpukhov Data on Total Cross Sections". Physical Review D. 2 (3). American Physical Society (APS): 529–531. doi:10.1103/physrevd.2.529. ISSN 0556-2821.
- EDEN, R. J. (1 January 1971). "Theorems on High Energy Collisions of Elementary Particles". Reviews of Modern Physics. 43 (1). American Physical Society (APS): 15–35. doi:10.1103/revmodphys.43.15. ISSN 0034-6861.
- Eden, R. J.; Kaiser, G. D. (1 May 1971). "Theoretical and Experimental Consequences of a Violation of the Pomeranchuk Theorem on Total Cross Sections at High Energies". Physical Review D. 3 (9). American Physical Society (APS): 2286–2288. doi:10.1103/physrevd.3.2286. ISSN 0556-2821.
- Eden, R J (1 September 1971). "Regge poles and elementary particles". Reports on Progress in Physics. 34 (3). IOP Publishing: 995–1053. doi:10.1088/0034-4885/34/3/304. ISSN 0034-4885.
- Eden, R.J.; Kaiser, G.D. (1971). "Asymptotic properties of scattering amplitudes and their experimental consequences". Nuclear Physics B. 28 (1). Elsevier BV: 253–282. doi:10.1016/0550-3213(71)90377-4. ISSN 0550-3213.
- Energy Conservation in the UK, in: NEDO Report, London, HMSO, 1974
- World Energy Demand, IPC Science and Technology Press, 1978
- (with M.V.Posner, R.Bending, E.Crouch, J.Stanislaw) Energy Economics: Growth, Resources and Policies, Cambridge University Press, 1981 ISBN 978-0-5212-3685-0
- (with R. C. Bending, R. K. Cattell) Energy and structural change in the United Kingdom and Western Europe, Annual Review of Energy, Vol. 12, 1987, p. 185–222
- World energy to 2050. Outline scenarios for energy and electricity, Energy Policy, Vol. 21, 1993, p. 231–237
- Clare Hall — The Origins and Development of a College for Advanced Study, Cambridge University Press, 2009 ISBN 978-0-9532-7173-3
