= Margaret Cardwell =

British scholar, Dickens specialist (died 2011)

Margaret Cardwell was a reader in English at Queen's University Belfast, a specialist in the works of Charles Dickens. She was a winner of the British Academy's Rose Mary Crawshay Prize in 1994.

== Life ==
Margaret Cardwell was born in Blackpool. She attended the Fleetwood Grammar School and read English at Leeds University, where she obtained a first class degree. She taught at Blackpool, then joined Westfield College in London for her MA. In 1969, she obtained her doctorate from Bedford College, London, while also working at the Froebel Institute College in Roehampton.

Cardwell joined the Queen's University, Belfast in the English department in 1967, where she stayed until her retirement in 1987. She died in 2011 in Somerset.

== Works ==
Cardwell had a long association with the Oxford University Press. She edited the Clarendon editions of Charles Dickens's The Mystery of Edwin Drood (1972), Martin Chuzzlewit (1982), and Great Expectations (1993), for the last of which she won the Rose Mary Crawshay Prize.

Edwin Drood, famously, is Dickens' unfinished novel, and Cardwell's edition was noted for its restoration of meddlesome phrases and judicious use of various readings, as well as the most comprehensive record of the evolution of the book. Cardwell demonstrated the affinities between Oliver Twist and Drood, and indeed traced the change in Dickens's emphasis from the characters of Rosa and Edwin to Jesper.

Her edition of Martin Chuzzlewit was considered definitive. Based on Dickens's 1844 text, she adroitly selected the emendations, and recovered the likeliest renditions of Dickens' misspelled or misprinted terms of expression. As sixteen of nineteen of the work's monthly print installments were missing the proofs, she faced the complexity of determining the variations from manuscript to the first edition, and dealt judiciously with extracting the appropriately annotated final form.

Cardwell examined the evolution of Great Expectations as well, as part of her award-winning edition in 1993. She showed how the earliest version of the novel appeared in the United States, in the Harper's Weekly (which could accordingly be considered the first edition) but that further modifications by Dickens occurred (for instance, a major break in the third chapter of the American version). However, her choice of the 1861 edition of the novel as the copy-text for the definitive edition was criticised for accepting several hundred readings as authorial.
