= Mary Louisa Boyle =

English writer and correspondent of Dickens and Tennyson

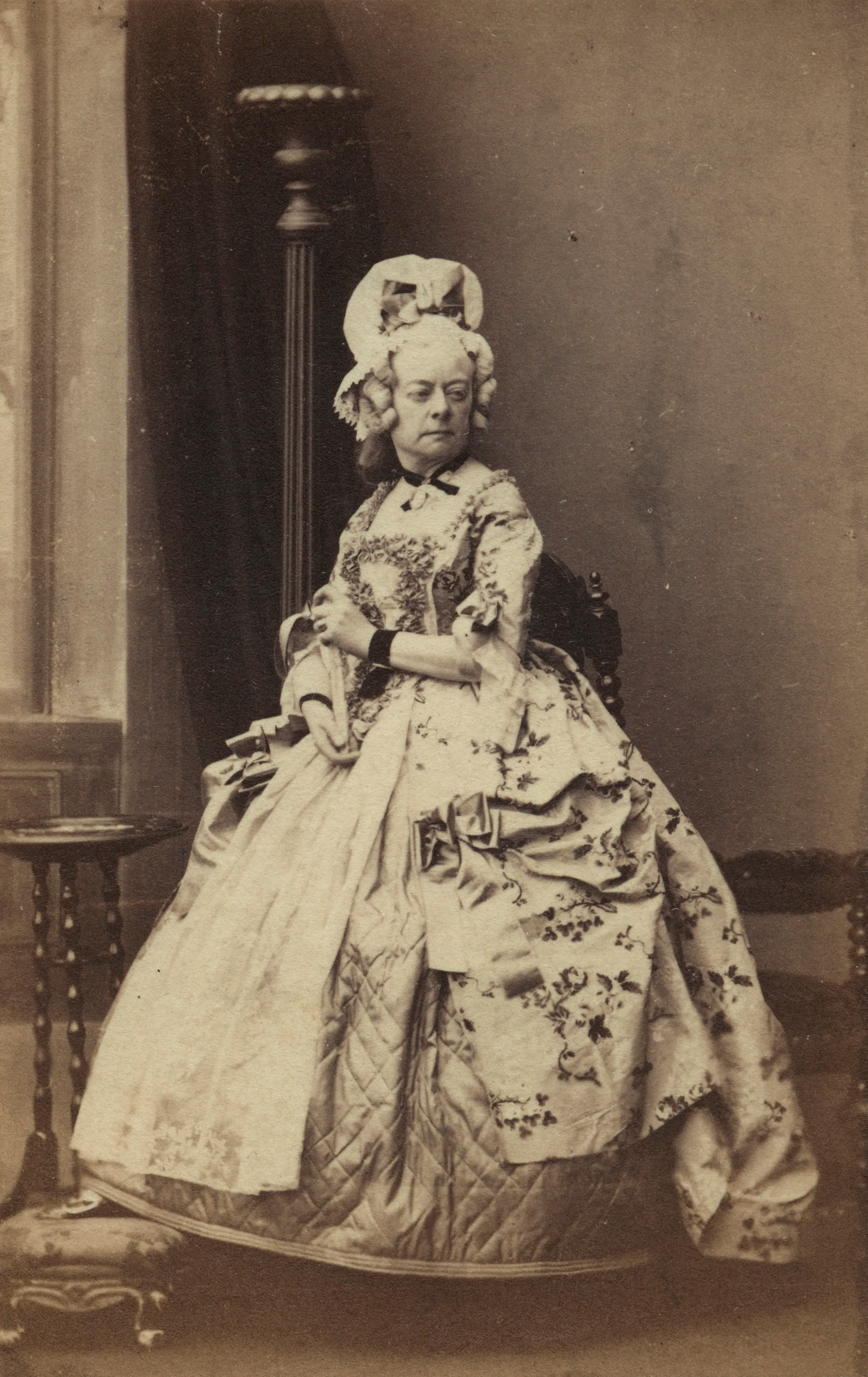
- Portrait by Camille Silvy, 1860
- Born: 12 November 1810; London, England
- Died: 17 April 1890 (aged 79); London, England
- Occupations: Writer; Actress
- Known for: Friend of Charles Dickens and Alfred, Lord Tennyson
- Relatives: Audrey Tennyson (niece); Hallam Tennyson (son-in-law)

Mary Louisa Boyle (12 November 1810 – 17 April 1890) was an English writer and amateur actress who moved in the literary circles of Charles Dickens and Alfred, Lord Tennyson.

Mary Boyle: Her Book

== Early life and writing ==
She was born on 12 November 1810 at Cavendish Square, London, one of six children of Captain Sir Courtenay Boyle and his wife, Carolina Amelia Poyntz. She was educated at Miss Poggi's school in Brighton. The family lived at Hampton Court until 1840, during which time Mary published her two novels, The State Prisoner (1837) and The Forester: a Tale of 1688 (1839). They then moved to Somerset, where they remained for ten years. Mary produced a book of verse, The Bridal of Melchia, in 1844.

== Acting and friendship with Dickens ==
In the 1840s Mary met the Irish comedic writer Charles Lever while in Florence. He took credit for training her to act in a letter where he referred to her later association with Charles Dickens:

"Mary Boyle—that was Dickens’s prima donna—was of my training; her infant steps (she was five-and-thirty at the time) were first led by me; and I remember holding a ladder for her while she sang a love-song out of a window, and (trying to study my own part at the same time) I set fire to her petticoats!"

In 1849, she met Charles Dickens at Rockingham Castle. She was afterwards a frequent visitor and affectionate correspondent of Dickens, who took her on to act in several of his amateur performances. He later wrote of her "acting in every English shire incessantly, and getting a harvest of laurels all the year round."

In 1851, Dickens heavily edited and published her story, "My Mahogany Friend" (a title of his own suggestion) in his magazine Household Words. He wrote to her about the "thorny track" of professional writing, which has been interpreted as delicately worded advice not to pursue a career as a novelist. Her next work came in 1865, Tangled Weft: Two Stories.

Dickens’ letters to her record several of her gifts to him and call her "among the few whom I most care for and best love." He encouraged her to read Great Expectations in its year of release, writing of its popular appeal. She customarily sent him a flower for his button-hole for his public readings, which she accomplished even when he was in Boston. She was present at Gad's Hill on the day of his death in 1870.

== Friendship with Tennyson and later life ==
Mary became acquainted with Alfred, Lord Tennyson in 1882 when her niece, Audrey, married Tennyson's son Hallam. Tennyson wrote the poem "To Mary Boyle" (publ. 1889) to her, in which he reminisces about their younger days and invites her to keep her promise to leave London and visit him at his country home, Farringford, while she was in a period of bereavement.

She died on 17 April 1890 at her London home. Her memoir was published as Mary Boyle: Her Book by her nephew in 1901.

== Works ==
- The State Prisoner (1837)
- The Forester: a Tale of 1688 (1839)
- The Bridal of Melchia (1844)
- "My Mahogany Friend" (1851)
- Tangled Weft: Two Stories (1865)
- Mary Boyle: Her Book (posthumous, 1901)
