= Courtenay Boyle =

Vice-Admiral The Honourable Sir Courtenay Boyle KCH
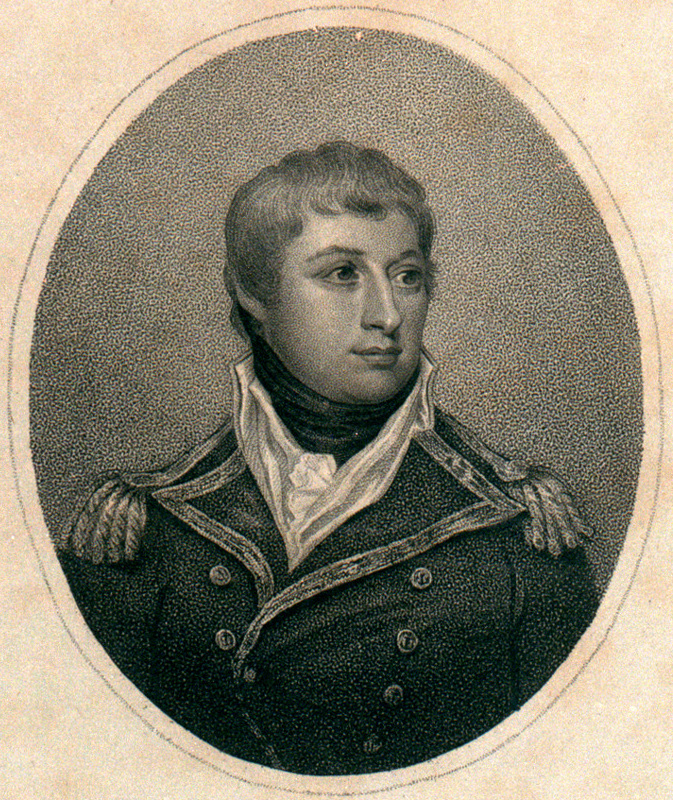
- Portrait by Joyce Gold, 1813
- Born: 3 September 1770
- Died: 21 May 1844 (aged 73)
- Relatives: Sir Edmund Boyle (father)
- Military career
- Allegiance: Great Britain; United Kingdom
- Branch: Royal Navy
- Service years: 1780–1844
- Rank: Vice-admiral
- Commands: HMS Fox; HMS Kangaroo; HMS Hyaena; HMS Cormorant; HMS Seahorse; HMS Amfitrite; HMS Royal William
- Conflicts: American War of Independence; Fourth Anglo-Dutch War; Battle of Dogger Bank (1781); French Revolutionary Wars; Napoleonic Wars
- Awards: Knight Commander of the Royal Guelphic Order

Arms of Boyle: Per bend embattled argent and gules

Sir Courtenay Boyle, KCH (3 September 1770 – 21 May 1844) was a Royal Navy officer and politician who served in the American War of Independence and French Revolutionary and Napoleonic Wars. In 1807 he served as a Member of Parliament for Bandon.

== Origins ==
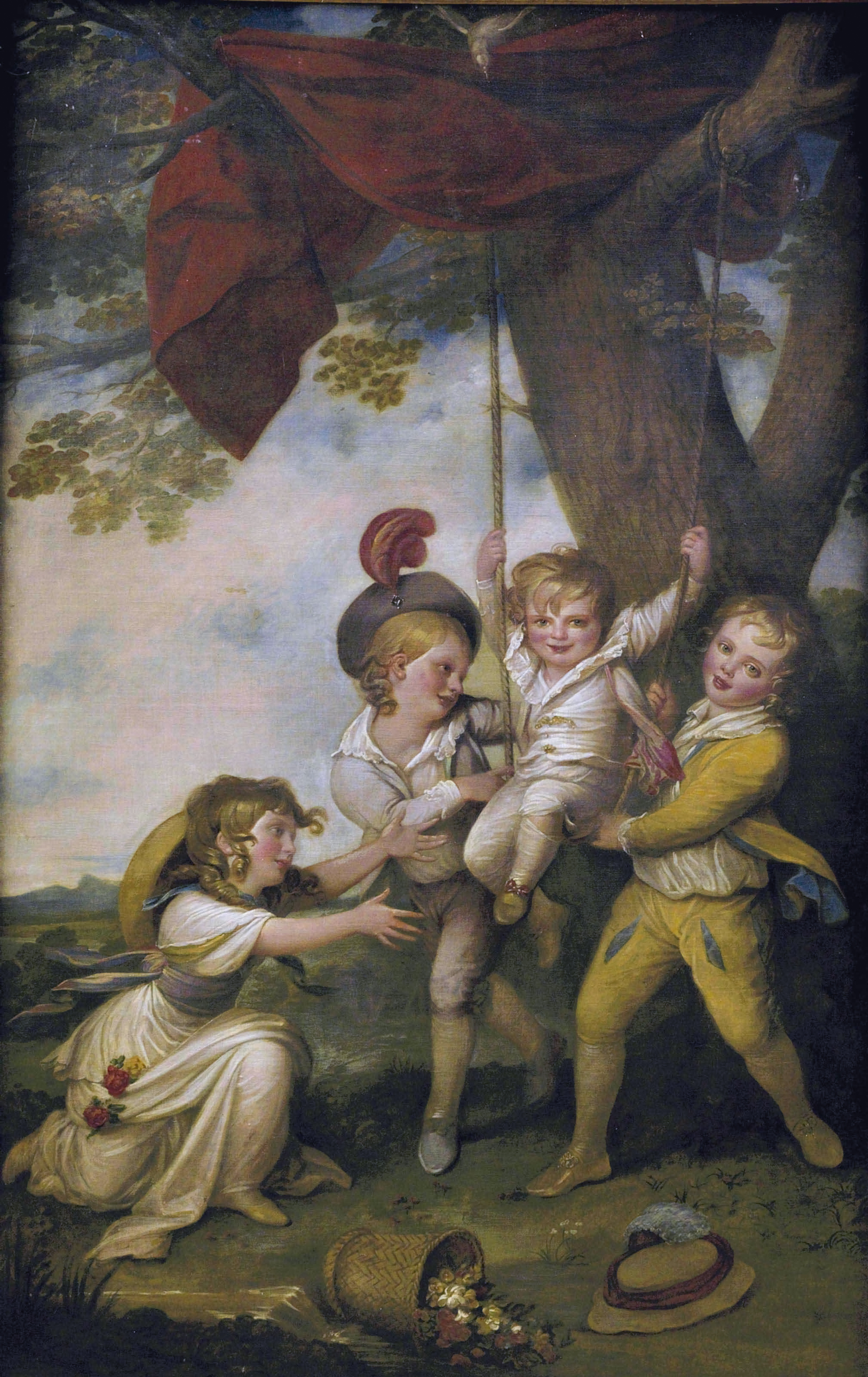
The young Courtenay Boyle is depicted playing with his brothers Edmund and Richard, and his sister Lucy, in a painting by Richard Cosway, circa 1775

Courtenay Boyle was born in 1770, the 3rd but 2nd surviving son of Edmund Boyle, 7th Earl of Cork by his first wife Anne Courtenay, second daughter and co-heiress of Kellond Courtenay of Painsford in the parish of Ashprington in Devon, a niece of John Montagu, 4th Earl of Sandwich. Courtenay Boyle was a relative of Captain Sir Charles Boyle, who commanded the 98-gun HMS Windsor Castle at the Battle of Cape Finisterre in 1805. He was also a relative of Commodore Robert Boyle, who died in a hurricane off Jamaica while commanding a squadron dispatched to the West Indies.

== Career ==
=== American War of Independence ===
Boyle went to sea aboard during the American War of Independence, he went out in HMS Gibraltar, and on returning home was sent to a naval academy at Greenwich. He entered the Royal Navy on 12 September 1780, serving as a midshipman on board the frigate HMS Latona frigate, commanded by Sir Hyde Parker. In this ship he was present at the Battle of Dogger Bank between the squadron under the command of Sir Hyde Parker, the father of the Latona's captain, and a Dutch force under Admiral Johan Zoutman. Some time later he fell from the booms into the orlop, and was obliged to go on shore to recover.

He joined HMS Goliath and remained in that ship until 8 April 1783, when he was sent to the Royal Naval Academy at Portsmouth to finish his nautical studies, where he remained until March 1784. He was appointed to the 28-gun HMS Boreas, under the auspices of Horatio Nelson, and after visiting the West Indies, returned to Spithead in the summer of 1787. With HMS Boreas having been put out of commission, Boyle was received at the recommendation of Nelson on board HMS Barfleur, bearing Lord Hood's flag; and in that ship he continued his services until 25 November 1788, when he was transferred into HMS Leander, the flagship of Admiral Joseph Peyton, by whom, on 5 June 1789, was sent on board the frigate HMS Aquilon, serving with the Mediterranean Fleet. Promoted to lieutenant on 22 November 1790, Boyle subsequently served on board HMS Vanguard. Shortly after this he was confirmed in the rank of lieutenant and appointed to HMS Roebuck.

=== French Revolutionary Wars ===
At the beginning of the French Revolutionary Wars in 1793, Boyle embarked as a lieutenant on board the 74-gun third rate ship of the line HMS Egmont. This ship, after fitting at Plymouth, was attached to the squadron under Rear-Admiral John Gell that conveyed the East India fleet to a certain latitude and then proceeded to cruise off the coast of Spain. On 27 May he was appointed in charge of the cutter HMS Fox, and shortly afterwards Boyle served on board the ships of the line HMS Excellent and HMS Saturn. During the spring of 1795 he embarked in the 50-gun HMS Jupiter, to bring over Princess Caroline of Brunswick from Cuxhaven. On 6 April 1795, just on his return from that service, he was promoted to commander; and during the month of October he was given command of the 18-gun brig HMS Kangaroo, lying at Deptford.

Boyle was sent to cruise off the Texel and Coruña for the protection of English packets, where he destroyed several row-boats. Soon after returning home, he received orders to refit the Kangaroo. He also captured a French privateer of eight guns and 48 men, and the 14-gun Spanish lugger Purísima Concepción. Shortly before the French expedition to Ireland in support of the Irish patriots, the Kangaroo was driven by bad weather into Bantry Bay, and had soon after sighted a French fleet, which Boyle believed to consist from nineteen to twenty-two sail. He was promoted to captain on 30 June 1797. Boyle was appointed to HMS Hyaena in early 1798, and served in her off Cherbourg, St. Malo and the Isle of Has, until March 1799, when he was obliged to resign his ship in consequence of an injury he had sustained from being thrown out of a carriage when about to sail for Lisbon. In June 1799 he was appointed to command the 24-gun HMS Cormorant, and after taking convoy to Lisbon and Gibraltar, he joined Lord Keith's squadron at Leghorn. On 20 May 1800, the Cormorant was wrecked off Damietta due to faulty navigational charts. Contrary to the usages of war, Captain Boyle was kept in close confinement for nearly three months. Having recovered his liberty, he was acquitted for the loss of his ship.

=== Napoleonic Wars ===
In the spring of 1803 Boyle was given command of the 32-gun frigate HMS Seahorse and ordered to the Mediterranean, where he was actively employed under Nelson during an important part of his Lordship's command on that station. On 11 July 1804, three of Seahorse's boats took part in an action against twelve French settees, most of them laden with cargo, lying at La Vandour, in the bay of Hyères. Most of the French vessels were set alight by parties of the British frigates HMS Seahorse, HMS Maidstone and HMS Narcissus. In January 1805, Lord Nelson, lying at anchor in Madalena Harbour, Sardinia, dispatched HMS Seahorse and HMS Active to watch the enemy in Toulon. Boyle was frequently chased away by the French ships, but carried out his duties. On 18 January 1805 the Seahorse, while cruising with HMS Active along the French coast, were sighted and pursued by the whole French fleet, but effected their escape.

Boyle sailed to communicate the news that the French had put to sea to Lord Nelson, who was lying at anchor north of Sardinia. On 4 May 1805, while cruising off the southern Spanish coast, Boyle received intelligence that a Spanish convoy, chiefly laden on government account with gunpowder for the gun-boats at Málaga, Ceuta and Algeciras, was upon the coast. He then kept close along the Spanish coast, and at 2 p.m. the convoy was sighted from the mast-head of the Seahorse. At 5 pm. Boyle observed that the Spanish vessels hauled into San Pedro, an anchorage to the eastward of Cape de Gata, under the protection of a fort and several schooners and mortar launches. He then sent his first lieutenant, George Downie, and other men of his crew in a cutter to board the vessels. Covered by the fire of the Seahorse, Downie boarded a Spanish brig, laden with 1170 quintals of powder. Finding that the Spanish gun-boats continued to fire on the Seahorse, which had already suffered damage to her main topgallant mast and had had several braces and bowlines shot away, the Seahorse discontinued the engagement and stood out to the offing.

=== Last years of service ===
In the summer of 1805 Boyle exchanged into HMS Amfitrite, a Spanish prize frigate, and returned to England. His last appointment afloat was in May 1806, when he was appointed to command HMS Royal William, the flagship of Admiral Sir George Montagu at Spithead; which ship he retained until June 1809, when he succeeded Captain George Henry Towry as a Commissioner of Transports. The control of the dockyard at Sheerness was confided to him in the summer of 1814. Some time after, he was appointed by an order in council to superintend the bringing up of the arrears of the accounts left unaudited by the Transport Board at the time of its dissolution, and he subsequently obtained a seat on the Navy Board.

In 1832 he was nominated a Knight-Commander of the Hanoverian Guelphic Order, and made a Knight Bachelor on 3 December that year. He was promoted to rear-admiral on the retired list on 22 July 1830, but in 1840 was restored to the active list, and was promoted to the rank of vice-admiral of the red in November 1841. On the 1841 census he was living at Marine Parade, Brighton.

== New Zealand Company ==
In 1825 Boyle was a director of the New Zealand Company, a venture chaired by the wealthy John George Lambton, Whig MP (and later 1st Earl of Durham), that made the first attempt to colonise New Zealand.

== Marriage and children ==
On 16 April 1799 he married Caroline Amelia Poyntz, a daughter of William Poyntz of Midgham House in the parish of Thatcham, Berkshire. The estate of Midgham had been purchased by Stephen Poyntz (1685–1750), a diplomat born at Cornhill in the City of London. The ancient and prominent Poyntz family first appeared in England in the late 12th century as feudal barons of Curry Mallet in Somerset, and were later seated at Iron Acton in Gloucestershire. By his wife he had 3 sons and 3 daughters; among them was Mary Louisa Boyle (1810–1890), a popular novelist.

== Footnotes ==
Notes

Citations

Parliament of the United Kingdom
Preceded by Sir Broderick Chinnery	Member of Parliament for Bandon; 1806–1807	Succeeded by Henry Boyle, Viscount Boyle
