= Vicki Stone (academic) =

British nanotoxicologist

- Education: University of Leeds; University of Birmingham
- Scientific career
- Workplaces: Heriot-Watt University
- Thesis: Study of toxicological effects on hepatobiliary function in vitro (1994)

Vicki Stone is a British nanotoxicologist who is Director of the Nano‑Safety Research Group at Heriot‑Watt University and as an Honorary Principal Scientist at the Institute of Occupational Medicine. Stone has contributed to government‑commissioned reports on environmental pollution and has served on the UK Government Committee on the Medical Effects of Air Pollution. She has also been a member of the advisory board for the US Center for the Environmental Implications of Nanotechnology.

== Early life and education ==
Stone graduated from the University of Leeds in 1991 in physiology, receiving the University of Leeds Centenary Medal. She completed her doctoral research in toxicology at the University of Birmingham in 1994 under the supervision of Roger Coleman and Kevin Chipman. During her doctoral studies, she was awarded the British Toxicology Society Young Investigator Award.

== Research and career ==
Stone joined Heriot-Watt University as part of its School of Engineering and Physical Sciences, where she founded and directs the Nano‑Safety Research Group. Her work focuses on understanding the interactions between engineered nanomaterials and biological systems, with the aim of improving risk assessment and regulatory frameworks. The group specialises in assessing the potential hazards posed by engineered nanomaterials to human health and the environment. Their research examines how the physical and chemical properties of nanomaterials—such as size, composition, shape and surface charge—affect their biological interactions and toxicity. A key focus of the group is the development of testing strategies aligned with the 3Rs principles (replacement, reduction and refinement of animal use). Their research also includes studies on the safety and efficacy of nanomedicines used in the diagnosis and treatment of cancer, cardiovascular disease and infectious diseases.

Stone has advocated to support technical professionals, developed a new workload allocation model and increased the visibility of senior managers.

== Selected publications ==
- Craig A Poland; Rodger Duffin; Ian Kinloch; et al. (20 May 2008). "Carbon nanotubes introduced into the abdominal cavity of mice show asbestos-like pathogenicity in a pilot study". Nature Nanotechnology. 3 (7): 423–428. doi:10.1038/nnano.2008.111. ISSN 1748-3387. PMID 18654567. Wikidata Q29547366.
- Paul J A Borm; David Robbins; Stephan Haubold; et al. (14 August 2006). "The potential risks of nanomaterials: a review carried out for ECETOC". Particle and Fibre Toxicology. 3 (1): 11. doi:10.1186/1743-8977-3-11. ISSN 1743-8977. PMC 1584248. PMID 16907977. Wikidata Q28767397.
- Andrew D. Maynard; Robert J Aitken; Tilman Butz; et al. (1 November 2006). "Safe handling of nanotechnology". Nature. 444 (7117): 267–269. doi:10.1038/444267a. ISSN 1476-4687. PMID 17108940. Wikidata Q29617531.
