= Dave Green (astrophysicist) =

Radio astronomer

David A. Green
- Born: 1959 (age 66–67)
- Education: University of Cambridge
- Scientific career
- Fields: Astrophysics
- Workplaces: Cavendish Laboratory
- Doctoral advisor: Stephen Gull

Dave Green (born 1959) is an astrophysicist at the Cavendish Laboratory in Cambridge, UK and University Senior Lecturer at the University of Cambridge. He is also a Fellow of Churchill College, where he was a Director of Studies for Physics. His research focuses on supernova remnants (SNRs), including studies of G1.9+0.3 the youngest Galactic SNR yet identified, and he has written a book on the historical supernovae along with F. Richard Stephenson. He designed the cubehelix colour scheme for intensity images.

His sporting interests include coxing, cricket and croquet.
