= Marzari =

Marzari may refer to:

== Surname ==
- Darlene Marzari (born 1943), Canadian politician
- Edoardo Marzari (1905–1973), Italian priest and antifacist
- Giuseppe Marzari (1900–1974), Italian actor and humorist
- Nicola Marzari, scientist
- Paolo Marzari (1869–1955), Italian entrepreneur

== Other ==
- (7640) Marzari, minor planet
