= Malcolm Longair =

British physicist (born 1941)

Malcolm Longair CBE FRS FRSE
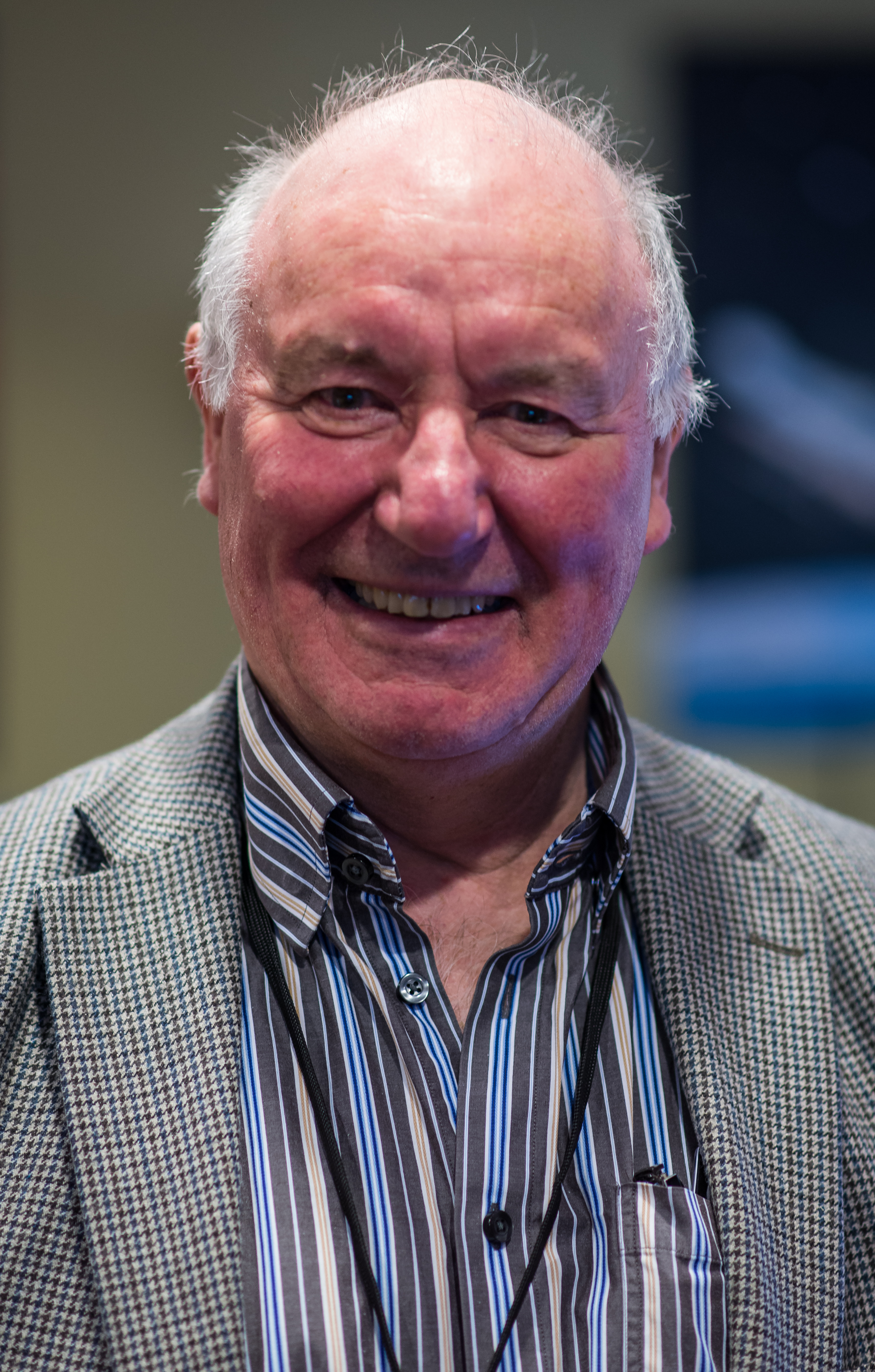
- Malcolm Longair in 2013 at the James Webb Space Telescope Advisory Committee (JSTAC), held at the Space Telescope Science Institute (STScI) in Baltimore. Portrait by Mark McCaughrean of the European Space Agency
- Born: Malcolm Sim Longair; 18 May 1941 (age 85); Dundee, Scotland
- Education: Morgan Academy
- Alma mater: University of Dundee; University of St Andrews; University of Cambridge
- Spouse: Deborah Howard (m. 1975)
- Awards: Britannica Award (1986)
- Scientific career
- Fields: Natural philosophy
- Workplaces: University of Cambridge; University of Edinburgh
- Thesis: The evolution of radio galaxies (1967)
- Doctoral advisor: Martin Ryle
- Doctoral students: Jim Dunlop; Stephen Gull; Simon Lilly; John Peacock
- Website: www.phy.cam.ac.uk/directory/longairm

Malcolm Sim Longair (born 18 May 1941) is a British physicist. From 1991 to 2008 he was the Jacksonian Professor of Natural Philosophy in the Cavendish Laboratory at the University of Cambridge. Since 2016 he has been editor-in-chief of the Biographical Memoirs of Fellows of the Royal Society.

== Education ==
He was born on 18 May 1941, and educated at Morgan Academy, Dundee, Scotland. He graduated in Electronic Physics from Queen's College, Dundee, which later became the University of Dundee, but was then part of the University of St Andrews, in 1963. He became a research student in the Radio Astronomy Group of the Cavendish Laboratory, Cambridge, where he completed his PhD in 1967 supervised by Martin Ryle.

== Career and research ==
From 1968 to 1969, he was a Royal Society Exchange Visitor to the Lebedev Institute of the USSR Academy of Sciences, where he worked with Vitaly Ginzburg and Yakov Zeldovich.

He held a Fellowship of the Royal Commission for the Exhibition of 1851 from 1966 to 1968 and was a Fellow of Clare Hall, Cambridge from 1967 to 1980. He has held visiting professorships at the California Institute of Technology (1972), the Institute for Advanced Study in Princeton (1978), the Center for Astrophysics | Harvard & Smithsonian (1990) and the Space Telescope Science Institute (1997). From 1980 to 1990, he held the joint posts of Astronomer Royal for Scotland, Regius Professor of Astronomy of the University of Edinburgh and Director of the Royal Observatory, Edinburgh. He is a Professorial Fellow and Vice-President of Clare Hall, Cambridge. He was Deputy Head of the Cavendish Laboratory with special responsibility for the teaching of physics from 1991 to 1997, and Head of the Cavendish Laboratory from 1997 to 2005.

Longair's primary research interests are in the fields of high-energy astrophysics and astrophysical cosmology. He has written eight books and many articles on this work. His most recent publication is the second edition of his Theoretical Concepts in Physics, released in December 2003. His other interests include music, mountain walking (completing the Munros in 2011), art, architecture and golf. As of 2017 he is the editor-in-chief of the Biographical Memoirs of Fellows of the Royal Society and has authored or co-authored biographies of John E. Baldwin, Vitaly Ginzburg, Brian Pippard, Geoffrey Burbidge and David J. C. MacKay.

During his career, he supervised numerous PhD students including Jim Dunlop, Stephen Gull, Simon Lilly and John Peacock.

== Awards and honours ==
Longair has received numerous awards, including:

- 1986 - the first Britannica Award for the Dissemination of Learning and the Enrichment of Life
- 1990 - In December 1990, he delivered the series of Royal Institution Christmas Lectures for Young People on television on the topic 'The Origins of Our Universe'.
- 1991 - From 1991 to 1992 he was President of the Physics Section of the British Association for the Advancement of Science.
- 1994 - Awarded the 1994 Science Prize of the Saltire Society-Royal Bank of Scotland Annual award.
- 1994 - Chairman of the Gemini Board, the international project to build 8-metre telescopes in the northern and southern hemispheres, for the years 1994 and 1995.
- 1995 - In 1995, he was Selby Fellow of the Australian Academy of Science and took a lecture demonstration entitled 'Measuring the Fundamentals' around all the state capitals of Australia.
- 1995 - Chairman of the Space Telescope Science Institute Council for 1995–6.
- 1996 - President of the Royal Astronomical Society 1996–8.
- 2000 - Appointed CBE in the 2000 New Year Honours List.
- 2004 - Elected a Fellow of the Royal Society (FRS).

== Personal life ==
Since 1975, Longhair has been married to Deborah Howard, an architectural historian. Together they have two children.

== Selected publications ==
Books

- High Energy Astrophysics: Volume 1, Particles, Photons and their Detection (3rd ed.). Cambridge University Press. 2011. ISBN 978-0521756181. 2nd: pbk, 1992, 440pp., ISBN 0521387736
- The Cosmic Century: A History of Astrophysics and Cosmology. Cambridge University Press. 2006. ISBN 0521474361.
- High Energy Astrophysics: Volume 2, Stars, the Galaxy and the Interstellar Medium (2nd ed.). Cambridge University Press. 1994. ISBN 0521435846.
- Theoretical Concepts in Physics: An Alternative View of Theoretical Reasoning in Physics. Cambridge University Press. 1984. ISBN 0521255503. revised and enlarged 2nd edition: 2003, 588pp., ISBN 0521821266
- Our Evolving Universe (2nd ed.). Cambridge University Press. 1996. ISBN 0521550912.
- Maxwell's Enduring Legacy: A Scientific History of the Cavendish Laboratory. Cambridge University Press. 2016. ISBN 9781107083691.

Papers

As of 2014 he had published 298 papers.

- Longair, Malcolm S (2008), "Maxwell and the science of colour", Philosophical Transactions of the Royal Society A, Mathematical, Physical, and Engineering Sciences, vol. 366, no. 1871 (published 28 May 2008), pp. 1685–96, Bibcode:2008RSPTA.366.1685L, doi:10.1098/rsta.2007.2178, PMID 18222905, S2CID 44749284

Academic offices
Preceded by Sir Alan Cook	Jacksonian Professor of Natural Philosophy; 1991–2008	Succeeded by James Stirling
