= Roger Coleman =

Roger Coleman may refer to:

- Roger Keith Coleman (1958–1992), American convict executed for murder
- Roger Coleman (professor) (born 1943), British academic advancing universal design
