= Andrew Maynard =

Andrew Maynard may refer to:

- Andrew Maynard (boxer) (born 1964), American boxer
- Andrew D. Maynard (born 1965), American scientist
- Andrew M. Maynard (born 1962), Connecticut state senator
