= John A. Peacock =

British cosmologist

John Peacock FRS FRSE
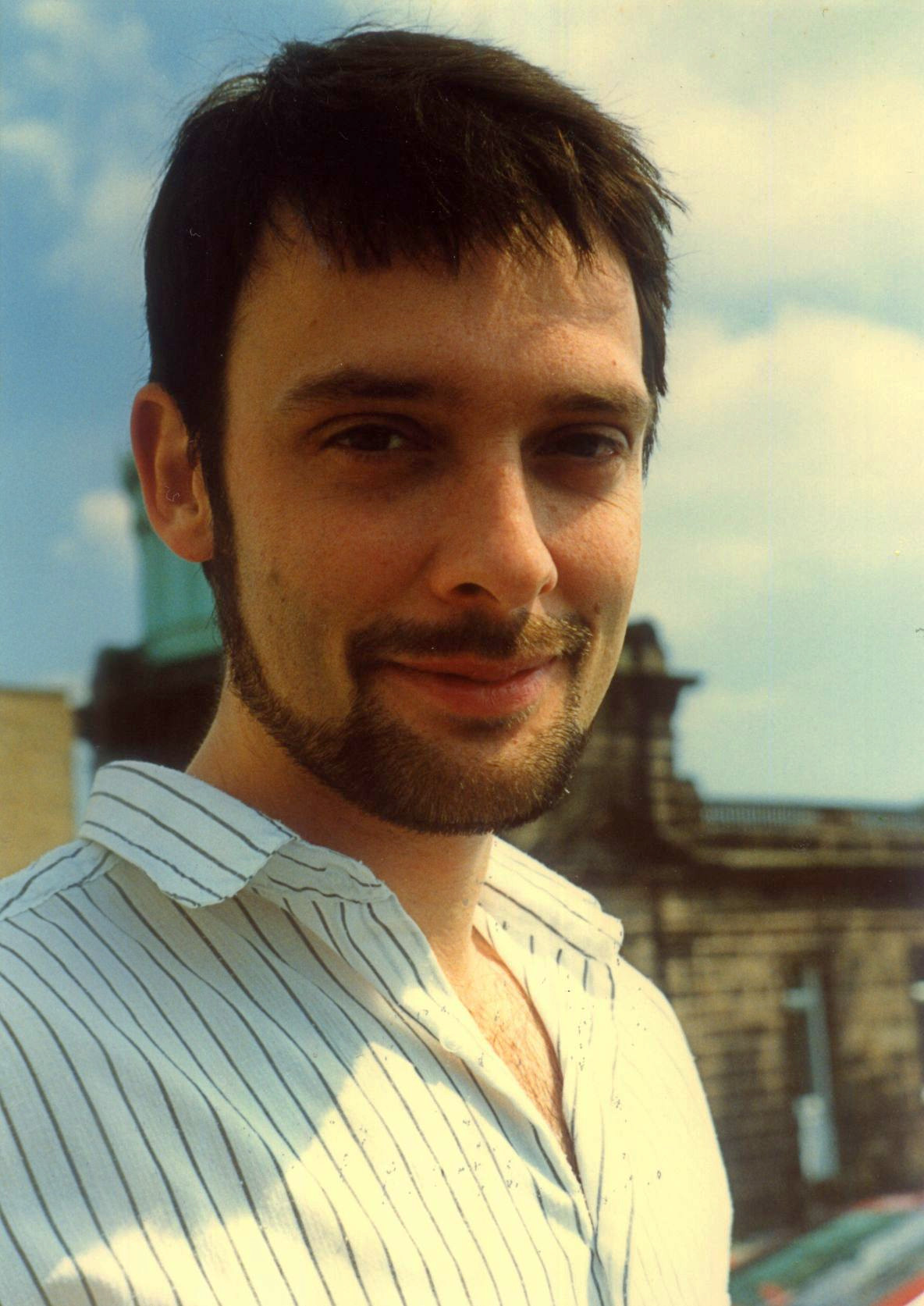
- Peacock in 1989
- Born: John Andrew Peacock; 27 March 1956 (age 70); Shaftesbury, England
- Education: Jesus College, Cambridge
- Known for: Large-scale structure of galaxies
- Spouse: Heather Peacock
- Awards: Fellow of the Royal Society of Edinburgh (2006); Fellow of the Royal Society (2007); Shaw Prize in Astronomy (2014); Gold Medal of the Royal Astronomical Society (2023)
- Scientific career
- Fields: Astrophysics, Cosmology
- Workplaces: University of Edinburgh
- Thesis: The radio spectra and cosmological evolution of extragalactic radio sources (1981)
- Doctoral advisor: Malcolm Longair, J. Wall
- Website: www.roe.ac.uk/~jap/

John Andrew Peacock (born 27 March 1956) is a British cosmologist, astronomer, and academic. He has been Professor of Cosmology at the University of Edinburgh since 1998. He was joint-winner of the 2014 Shaw Prize.

== Early life and education ==
Peacock was born on 27 March 1956 in Shaftesbury, Dorset, England, to Arthur Peacock and Isobel Peacock (née Moir). He studied Natural Sciences at Jesus College, Cambridge, and graduated with a first class Bachelor of Arts (BA) degree in 1977. He then undertook postgraduate research at the University of Cambridge's Cavendish Laboratory under the supervision of M. S. Longair and J. V. Wall. He completed his Doctor of Philosophy (PhD) degree in 1981 with a doctoral thesis titled "The radio spectra and cosmological evolution of extragalactic radio sources".

== Personal life ==
In 1982, Peacock married Heather, a nurse and medical educator. Together, they have three children.

== Honours ==
In 2006, Peacock was elected Fellow of the Royal Society of Edinburgh (FRSE). In 2007, he was elected Fellow of the Royal Society (FRS). In 2014, he was jointly awarded the Shaw Prize for Astronomy 'for their contributions to the measurements of features in the large-scale structure of galaxies used to constrain the cosmological model including baryon acoustic oscillations and redshift-space distortions'. His co-recipients were Daniel Eisenstein and Shaun Cole.
