= F. Richard Stephenson =

British astronomer and physicist

F. Richard Stephenson (born Francis Richard Stephenson, 26 April 1941) is an Emeritus Professor at the University of Durham, in the Physics department and the East Asian Studies department. His research concentrates on historical aspects of astronomy, in particular analyzing ancient astronomical records to reconstruct the history of Earth's rotation. He has an asteroid named after him: 10979 Fristephenson.

== Bibliography ==
- David H. Clark & F. Richard Stephenson, The Historical supernovae, Pergamon Press, Oxford, 1977, 233 pages, ISBN 0080209149
- F. Richard Stephenson & David H. Clark, Applications of Early Astronomical Records, Oxford University Press, 1979, 124 pages, ISBN 0-19-520122-1
- Hermann Hunger, Christopher B. F. Walker, Richard Stephenson & Kevin K. C. Yau, Halley's Comet in History, British Museum Press, 1985, 64 pages, ISBN 0-7141-1118-X
- F. Richard Stephenson, Supplement to the Tuckerman Tables, American Philosophical Society, 1986, 564 pages, ISBN 0-87169-170-1
- F. Richard Stephenson & M. A. Houlden, Atlas of historical eclipse maps. East Asia 1500 BC-AD 1900, Cambridge University Press, 1986, ISBN 9780521106948
- F. Richard Stephenson, "The identification of early returns of comet Halley from ancient astronomical records", p. 203 – 214 in Comet Halley. Investigations, results, interpretations, Vol. 2, Prentice Hall, 1990
- F. Richard Stephenson, Astronomical Observations from the Ancient Orient, Prentice Hall, 1990, 350 pages, ISBN 0-7458-0285-0
- F. Richard Stephenson, Historical Eclipses and Earth's Rotation, Cambridge University Press, 1997, 573 pages, ISBN 0-521-46194-4
- F. Richard Stephenson & David A. Green, Historical supernovae and their remnants, Oxford, Oxford University Press, 2002, 252 p., ISBN 0198507666
