= Cavendish Professor of Physics =

Senior faculty position in physics at the University of Cambridge

The Cavendish Professorship is one of the senior faculty positions in physics at the University of Cambridge. It was founded on 9 February 1871 alongside the famous Cavendish Laboratory, which was completed three years later. William Cavendish, 7th Duke of Devonshire endowed both the professorship and laboratory in honour of his relative, chemist and physicist Henry Cavendish.

== History ==
=== Creation of the Cavendish Laboratory ===
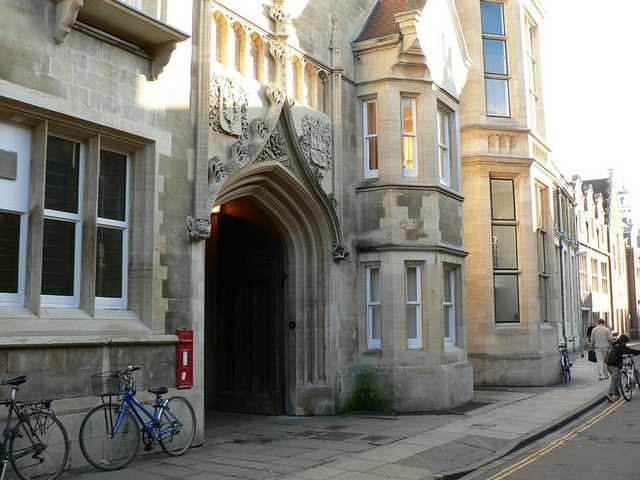
The old Cavendish Laboratory in Cambridge, England

Before the middle of the nineteenth century, science was largely pursued by individuals, either wealthy amateurs or academics working in their college accommodation. In 1869, a committee formed by the Senate reported that creating a dedicated Laboratory and Professorship would cost £6,300. The then chancellor of the university, William Cavendish met that cost privately 18 months later, and named the department in honour of his relative, the 18th century natural philosopher Henry Cavendish.

=== James Clerk Maxwell ===
The first Cavendish Professor was the then relatively obscure James Clerk Maxwell, who had yet to complete the work that would make him the most renowned physicist of the nineteenth century. His appointment was announced on 8 March 1871, and despite initial disappointment at his being offered the place, his inaugural lecture was looked forward to by his likely students as well as his future colleagues. However, it was poorly advertised, so it was only to his students that he laid out his plans for physics at Cambridge. When Maxwell began the actual course a few days later with a lecture on heat, it was attended by academics in formal dress, in the belief that it was the first lecture. Maxwell spent the next three years supervising the construction of the dedicated Cavendish Laboratory, and published in 1873 A Treatise on Electricity and Magnetism. Maxwell's health deteriorated a short time into his tenure, and he died in 1879, aged 48.

=== Lord Rayleigh ===
John William Strutt, 3rd Baron Rayleigh replaced Maxwell immediately upon his death, being universally agreed upon as the only successor. Raleigh spent £1,500 updating the laboratory, and created a new practical course, revolutionising practical instruction, and in 1882 he allowed women to take the course as well. In his five years as Cavendish Professor, he published 50 papers and expanded the number of students to 48.

=== J. J. Thomson ===
J. J. Thomson was made Cavendish Professor in 1884 at the age of 28, leading one senior member of the University to comment that "Matters have come to a pretty pass when they elect mere boys professors." In 1895, a change was made to the university regulations which allowed students who had not studied at Cambridge to receive a B.A. by submitting a thesis which was judged "of distinction as a record of original research." Among the students attracted by this change was future Cavendish Professor Ernest Rutherford. Whilst Thomson was Cavendish Professor, he discovered the electron and the existence of isotopes, and also fostered an atmosphere of friendliness and mutual helpfulness.

=== Ernest Rutherford ===
Rutherford returned to Cambridge in 1918, and spent the last 19 years of his life there. This was around the time of the change from classical to modern physics, and Rutherford was something of a contradiction, dressing as a Victorian gentleman but working on the cutting edge of physics. Rutherford died suddenly in 1937, marking the end of an era for the Cavendish.

=== William Lawrence Bragg ===
Sir Lawrence Bragg became Cavendish Professor just before the outbreak of the Second World War, which resulted in many staff joining various defence research establishments, notably to develop radar. Work on neutron physics performed at this time was translated into the Manhattan Project to build an atom bomb.

=== Nevill Francis Mott ===
Nevill Mott was appointed Cavendish Professor in 1954, bringing with him from Bristol, his expertise in the rapidly developing area of Solid State Physics. In 1971 the "Cavendish Professorship of Experimental Physics" was renamed the "Cavendish Professorship of Physics", implicitly acknowledging the broader role of both theory and experiment in Physics.

=== Alfred Brian Pippard ===
Brian Pippard became the first elected appointee to the newly retitled position in 1971. During his tenure as Cavendish Professor, Pippard strengthened the Teaching Committee and was proactive in the reform of undergraduate teaching in Cambridge, compiling the 1971 edition of the "Cavendish Problems in Classical Physics", since studied by generations of Cavendish students.

Until 1979, the holder of the Cavendish Professorship implicitly held the role of head of the Physics Department at the Cavendish Laboratory. The two positions were separated in 1979, when Alan Cook became the first explicitly appointed Head of Department.

== List of Cavendish Professors ==
There have been ten Cavendish Professors since its inception:

- James Clerk Maxwell (1871–1879)
- John William Strutt, 3rd Baron Rayleigh (1879–1884)
- J. J. Thomson (1884–1919)
- Ernest Rutherford (1919–1937)
- William Lawrence Bragg (1938–1953)
- Nevill Francis Mott (1954–1971)
- Brian Pippard (1971–1984)
- Sam Edwards (1984–1995)
- Richard Friend (1995–2020)
- Nicola Marzari (2026–)
