= DesignAge =

Cross-disciplinary action research programme

- Established: 1991
- Focus: Design for an aging population
- Director: Roger Coleman
- Location: London, UK
- Website: www.hhc.rca.ac.uk/archive/hhrc/programmes/designage
- Dissolved: 1999

DesignAge was a cross-disciplinary action research programme within the Royal College of Art in the UK, founded in 1991 in partnership with the Helen Hamlyn Foundation to "explore the implications for design of ageing populations" in the developed world. It was directed by Roger Coleman until 1999 when it was merged into the newly created Helen Hamlyn Research Centre. The programme was the recipient of the Queen's Anniversary Prize for Higher and Further Education in 1994 in the category of "the Arts".

== History ==
By the early 1990s, it was recognised that older adults, in particular adults over 50, were becoming an increasingly significant portion of the population, while improvements in nutrition and medicine were enabling these older adults to remain active. This demographic shift was thought to be permanent. However, the fact that the younger population represented a shrinking market and older population a growing one was largely ignored by the design profession. In response to the lack of understanding of these issues and the design community's lack of understanding of their implications, in 1991 DesignAge was founded to investigate the needs of the older population, to interpret the results of the research in a way relevant to designers and industry, and to develop new methodologies in design and design education in response to this demographic shift.

DesignAge argued that older adults were "rendered disabled" by public spaces and transportation systems that had not been designed for this segment of the population, and therefore design had an influential role to play in shaping the future, in that improvements of the life for older adults, as well as the job market and national economy could be realised if designers, manufacturers, and retailers could shift their attitudes towards ageing so as to collaborate to create age-friendly products and services. By pointing out that designing for the ageing population was designing for their own ageing, effectively reframing ageing as an issue of self-interest, DesignAge was able to engage younger designers to design for older people.

One of the ways that DesignAge used to engage design students was to hold an annual design competition, called the DesignAge Competition, held between 1992 and 1998, to challenge design students to design for their "future selves."

DesignAge also engaged the industry at large by approaching the Design Business Association (formed in 1986 by the Chartered Society of Designers) and suggesting a "product challenge" to their member agencies; these were small-scale events where they would work with older users to design products on a speculative basis for the ageing population.

In 1999 DesignAge became the Helen Hamlyn Research Centre and extended into the research of Inclusive Design.

== Selected publications ==
DesignAge produced a number of publications, including the seminal Designing For Our Future Selves published in 1993. Other publications include the “Designing for our future selves” special issue (volume 24, issue 1) of the journal Applied Ergonomics published in 1993; Once in a Lifetime: An Evaluation of Lifetime Homes in Hull, published in 1995; and Working Together, A New Approach To Design, published in 1997.

== Accomplishments ==
Within three years of its existence DesignAge reported that it was able to raise awareness of the issue within the design profession, in related disciplines including ergonomics, in education, and also among major retailers, manufacturers, and the age lobby.

In 1994, DesignAge was awarded the Queen's Anniversary Prize for Higher and Further Education in the category of "the Arts" in recognition of its contribution to the shift in perception towards designing for older adults and for working with corporations to design products for older adults and people incapacitated by illness.

== Notable collaborations ==
=== Design for Ageing Network ===
In 1994, DesignAge established a Europe-wide research network on design and ageing called the DAN (Design for Ageing Network), funded until 1997 by DG V of the European Commission (then the Directorate-General for Employment, Industrial Relations and Social Affairs). The network's goal was to "develop the necessary expertise, know-how and understanding to enable design and industry to respond to the growing population of over-50s in Europe in appropriate and life-enhancing ways" through the use of "in-depth collaboration with older people" that went "beyond simple measuring and questioning."

After DesignAge was subsumed into the Helen Hamlyn Research Centre, DAN continued to exist until early 2004 when it was superseded by the Include Network.

=== Presence project ===
DesignAge also participated in an EU-funded project called Presence, which ran from 1997 to 1999 and whose aim was "enhancing activity and presence of older people in communities".
