= C. Marcella Carollo =

Swiss astromoner

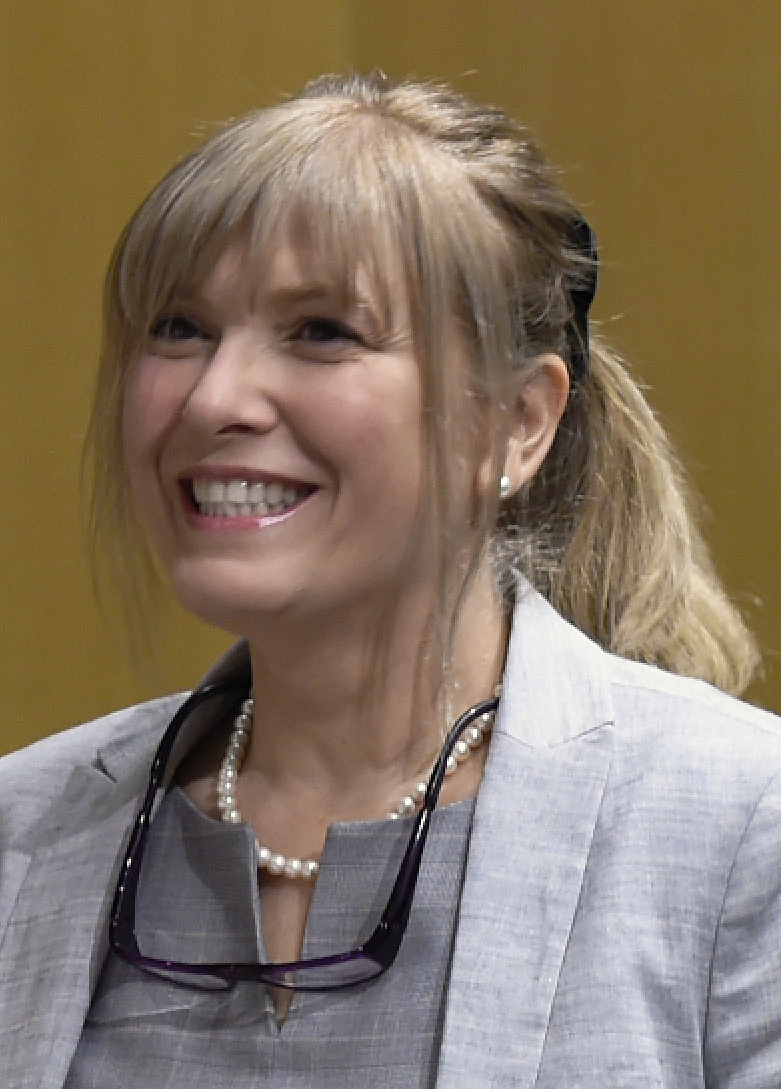
- Born: Palermo, Italy
- Education: LMU Munich (PhD)
- Known for: Galaxy formation and evolution Extragalactic astronomy
- Spouse: Simon Lilly
- Scientific career
- Fields: Astronomy Astrophysics
- Workplaces: ETH Zürich Columbia University Johns Hopkins University Leiden University

C. Marcella Carollo worked as a professional astronomer for 25 years between 1994 and 2019. Her scientific career was ended by the ETH Zürich who, following accusations that she had bullied students, made her the first Professor to be dismissed at ETH Zürich in the 165 years of its history. Carollo has maintained her innocence against these accusations, publicly commenting on her case in terms that indicate "academic mobbing". The dismissal was appealed unsuccessfully to the Swiss Federal Administrative Court.

== Education ==
Carollo began her studies at the University of Palermo where she earned a laurea degree in physics in 1987, with a specialization in biophysics. She worked for more than four years outside of academia before starting a PhD in astrophysics at LMU Munich, where she graduated in 1994.

== Career ==
Carollo was awarded a European Community Prize Fellowship, which she held at Leiden University from 1994 to 1996. She held a Hubble Postdoctoral Fellowship at Johns Hopkins University from 1997 to 1999. Carollo was appointed Assistant Professor in the Astronomy Department at Columbia University in 1999, a position she held until 2002. That year, she moved to ETH Zürich as an Associate Professor, in a dual appointment with her spouse Simon Lilly. She was promoted to Full Professor in 2007. She contributed as a member of the Science Oversight Committee to the development of the WFC3 camera which was installed on the Hubble Space Telescope in 2009. In 2012, she entered the Top Italian Scientist list from VIA Academy and in 2013 she was awarded the Winton Capital Research Prize. In 2018, she was identified as a Highly Cited Researcher for her research work at ETH between 2006 and 2016 – one of only about 20 ETH scientists so recognized.

== Research ==
Carollo's contribution to astronomy is in the fields of extragalactic astronomy and specifically galaxy formation and evolution. Her early work established the relation between the metallicity gradient and stellar mass in galactic spheroids, demonstrated the presence of dark matter halos beyond their half-light radii and was seminal in discovering and characterizing disk-like (pseudo) bulges and nuclear massive star clusters in disk galaxies like the Milky Way. Later she and her ETH group worked on the role of galactic environment and progenitor bias in galaxy evolution, the growth and "quenching" of massive galaxies at high redshifts, and participated in the discovery and characterization of the most distant galaxies in the universe, in the heart of the reionization epoch.

== Controversy ==
From 2016 onwards, doctoral students and postdoctoral researchers at ETH Zürich’s former Institute for Astronomy lodged complaints with the university’s ombudspersons about Carollo’s supervision and leadership style. In 2017 the ETH Board instructed ETH Zürich to carry out an administrative investigation into the situation at the institute, while ETH itself dissolved the Institute for Astronomy and placed Carollo and her husband Simon Lilly on sabbatical leave; the closure and allegations were reported in Swiss and international media, including NZZ am Sonntag and Science.

The administrative investigation was conducted by external lawyer Markus Rüssli and concluded with a final report in October 2018. The report found that Carollo’s leadership style and conduct towards subordinates conflicted with ETH regulations and internal codes of conduct, and characterised her behaviour as repeatedly disrespectful and personally harmful to staff. It recommended termination of her employment. Separately, on 17 January 2018 ETH Zürich opened an investigation into alleged scientific misconduct in connection with the case and suspended Carollo from her duties until the inquiries were concluded; this investigation was later closed without finding evidence of scientific misconduct, a point also noted by the Federal Administrative Court.

On 31 October 2018 ETH Zürich announced that, on the basis of the administrative investigation, it had initiated formal dismissal proceedings against “a professor at the former Institute for Astronomy”, stating that the external investigation had identified “serious breaches of duty over an extended period” and recommended termination. In accordance with the ETH Professors’ Ordinance, a special committee of internal and external professors was convened to advise on the proportionality of dismissal. The committee confirmed the core findings of the investigation and deemed Carollo’s behaviour towards doctoral students unacceptable, but considered a dismissal legally problematic in view of the lack of earlier formal warnings and recommended instead that she be barred, at least temporarily, from supervising doctoral students and subjected to monitoring and coaching measures.

On 14 March 2019 ETH President Joël Mesot announced that the ETH Executive Board had nonetheless decided to request Carollo’s dismissal, citing the confirmed misconduct and a loss of trust as having destroyed the basis for continued cooperation. On 15 July 2019 the ETH Board (ETH-Rat) followed this request and decided to terminate her employment with six months’ notice, stating that it regarded the allegations against the professor as justified. Carollo has consistently denied the allegations, describing herself as the target of an unfair campaign through statements by her legal counsel and in media interviews.

Carollo appealed the dismissal to the Federal Administrative Court. In April 2022 the court upheld the termination, holding that Carollo had over a period of years seriously violated important statutory and contractual duties through her conduct towards staff, so that a substantive ground for dismissal existed, and that the dismissal was neither abusive nor discriminatory under the Swiss Gender Equality Act. At the same time, the court found that ETH had failed to give an adequate prior warning and that the dismissal was therefore unjustified in the technical sense of federal personnel law; it awarded Carollo compensation amounting to eight months’ salary.
