= Mete Atatüre =

Turkish physicist

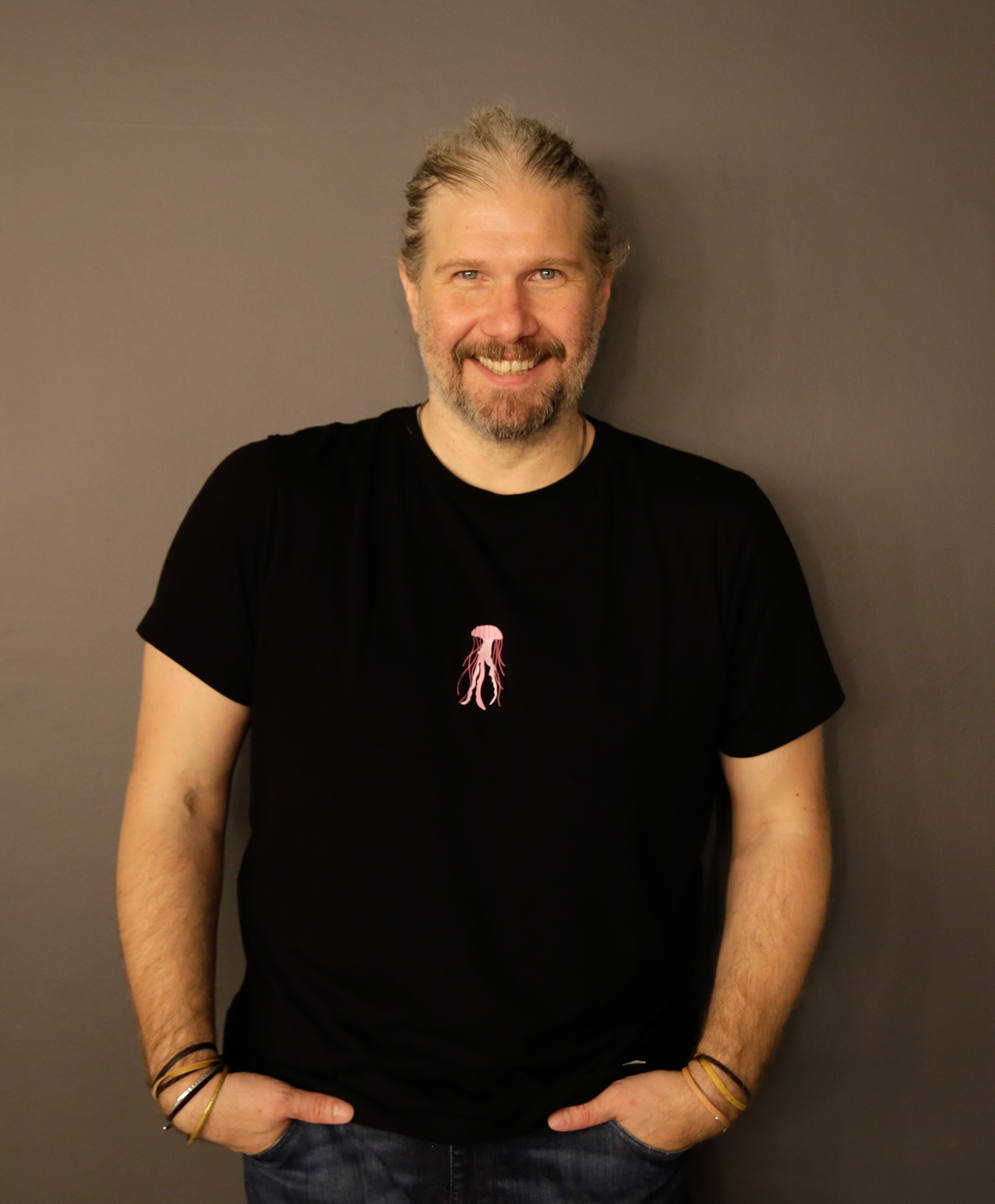
- Born: 19 February 1975 (age 51)
- Education: Bilkent University (BS); Boston University (PhD)
- Known for: Squeezing in resonance fluorescence, cooling and control of nuclear spins, first Faraday rotation of a single spin, optics of 2D materials (first atomically thin quantum LED, novel spin defects in diamond).
- Scientific career
- Fields: Quantum physics
- Workplaces: Cavendish Laboratory, University of Cambridge
- Thesis: Multiparameter Entanglement and Quantum Interferometry. (2002)

Mete Atatüre (born 19 February 1975) is a Turkish physicist working on experimental solid-state quantum optics, in particular on the optical control of spin-photon coupling for quantum networks as well as investigation of many-body physics in atomically-thin heterostructures, with the aim of developing new materials and devices for quantum sensing applications.

He currently leads the Quantum Optical Materials and Systems (QOMS) group at the University of Cambridge, with about 30 PhD students and research staff. He is also a co-founder and CSO of the spin-out Nu Quantum Ltd. Since October 2023, he has been the Head of the Cavendish Laboratory.

== Biography ==
Atatüre was born in Kayseri in 1975 and completed his secondary education at the Gazi Anatolian High School in Ankara in 1992 before obtaining a Bachelor of Science degree in 1996 from the Bilkent University, one of the top institutions in the country. He did his PhD at the Boston University in the United States in the Quantum Imaging Laboratory in 2002. He then moved to become a postdoctoral researcher in the Quantum Photonics Group of Ataç İmamoğlu at ETH Zurich in Switzerland where he received his Venia legendi for conducting long-lasting work on the full control of semiconductor quantum dots, including their positioning for cavity QED, the first demonstration of all-optical spin initialization and the first observation of the Faraday effect for a single spin. He joined the Cavendish Laboratory in June 2007 as a University Lecturer and Fellow of St John's College and was subsequently promoted to Reader (2011) and full-professorship (2015) before becoming the head of the Cavendish Laboratory (2023).

In Cambridge, he has made groundbreaking contributions to quantum optics, including fundamentals of quantum light via resonance fluorescence, quantum control of nuclei, diamond-based novel spin-photon interfaces for quantum networks, as well as the design of new functionalities from emerging classes of 2D materials, such as the first atomically-thin quantum LED.

== Academic and social activities ==
Atatüre is a member of the Institute of Physics in England, the Science Academy of Turkey, Academia Europaea in Europe, and Optica in the USA (formerly Optical Society of America). He was a Distinguished Visiting Professor of the Chinese Academy of Sciences between 2010 and 2014, and he is currently a Distinguished Research Fellow of Sabanci University, Turkey. He was a member of the editorial board of Scientific Reports for the period 2011–2015. He is a member of the advisory board for Small since 2019 and a member of the editorial board for IoP Materials for Quantum Technology since 2023.

He is also a prominent advocator of science communication and public engagement, with a large following on Twitter. His noted public engagements include 6 TEDx talks on quantum physics, light, science and diversity, as well as multiple opinion pieces in published media. He is also an activist for gender equality and diversity.

He also became a popular and emblematic scientific figure in Turkey, where he makes regular appearances in—or is discussed by—the media. He was nominated Turkish man of the year for 2015 by the fashion magazine GQ, who nicknamed him ""Profesör kahkaha" or "Professor Laughter" due to his friendly attitude and enthusiasm for his research". He is often sighted in Cambridge University with his cat Mietzi.

== Awards and honors ==
- 2021 Elected Member of Academia Europaea (EA)
- 2020 Thomas Young Medal (IoP)
- 2020 Fellow of the Optical Society of America (OSA)
- 2020 European Research Council – Advanced Award.
- 2020 Distinguished Research Fellow, Sabancı University.
- 2019 European Research Council – Proof of Concept Award.
- 2016 International Achievement Award – ForumIstanbul2023.
- 2016 Science Person of the Year – MSIC National Students' Choice Award.
- 2015 Outstanding Achievement Award – GQ Turkey Man of the Year
- 2013 European Research Council – Consolidator Award
- 2012 Elected Fellow of the Turkish Academy of Sciences (TÜBA)
- 2010 Elected Fellow of the Institute of Physics UK (IoP)
- 2010–2014 CAS Distinguished Visiting Professor – USTC, China
- 2007 European Research Council – Starter Award
- 2007 Venia legendi in Experimental Physics – ETH Zurich

== Publications ==
Atatüre is the author or co-author of more than a hundred of peer-reviewed publications.

Selected works:

- Atatüre, Mete; Englund, Dirk; Vamivakas, Nick; Lee, Sang-Yun; Wrachtrup, Joerg (2018-04-30). "Material platforms for spin-based photonic quantum technologies". Nature Reviews Materials. 3 (5). Springer Science and Business Media LLC: 38–51. Bibcode:2018NatRM...3...38A. doi:10.1038/s41578-018-0008-9. ISSN 2058-8437. S2CID 139734402.
- Atatüre, Mete; Dreiser, Jan; Badolato, Antonio; Högele, Alexander; Karrai, Khaled; Imamoglu, Atac (2006-04-28). "Quantum-Dot Spin-State Preparation with Near-Unity Fidelity". Science. 312 (5773). American Association for the Advancement of Science (AAAS): 551–553. Bibcode:2006Sci...312..551A. doi:10.1126/science.1126074. ISSN 0036-8075. PMID 16601152.
- Gangloff, D. A.; Éthier-Majcher, G.; Lang, C.; Denning, E. V.; Bodey, J. H.; Jackson, D. M.; Clarke, E.; Hugues, M.; Le Gall, C.; Atatüre, M. (2019-04-05). "Quantum interface of an electron and a nuclear ensemble". Science. 364 (6435). American Association for the Advancement of Science (AAAS): 62–66. arXiv:1812.07540. Bibcode:2019Sci...364...62G. doi:10.1126/science.aaw2906. ISSN 0036-8075. PMID 30792358.
- Stern, Hannah L.; Gu, Qiushi; Jarman, John; Eizagirre Barker, Simone; Mendelson, Noah; Chugh, Dipankar; Schott, Sam; Tan, Hoe H.; Sirringhaus, Henning; Aharonovich, Igor; Atatüre, Mete (2022-02-01). "Room-temperature optically detected magnetic resonance of single defects in hexagonal boron nitride". Nature Communications. 13 (1). Springer Science and Business Media LLC: 618. arXiv:2103.16494. Bibcode:2022NatCo..13..618S. doi:10.1038/s41467-022-28169-z. ISSN 2041-1723. PMC 8807746. PMID 35105864.
- Nick Vamivakas, A.; Zhao, Yong; Lu, Chao-Yang; Atatüre, Mete (2009-01-25). "Spin-resolved quantum-dot resonance fluorescence". Nature Physics. 5 (3). Springer Science and Business Media LLC: 198–202. arXiv:0806.3707. Bibcode:2009NatPh...5..198N. doi:10.1038/nphys1182. ISSN 1745-2473.
- Stockill, R.; Stanley, M. J.; Huthmacher, L.; Clarke, E.; Hugues, M.; Miller, A. J.; Matthiesen, C.; Le Gall, C.; Atatüre, M. (2017-07-07). "Phase-Tuned Entangled State Generation between Distant Spin Qubits". Physical Review Letters. 119 (1) 010503. American Physical Society (APS). arXiv:1702.03422. Bibcode:2017PhRvL.119a0503S. doi:10.1103/physrevlett.119.010503. ISSN 0031-9007. PMID 28731764.
- Palacios-Berraquero, Carmen; Barbone, Matteo; Kara, Dhiren M.; Chen, Xiaolong; Goykhman, Ilya; Yoon, Duhee; Ott, Anna K.; Beitner, Jan; Watanabe, Kenji; Taniguchi, Takashi; Ferrari, Andrea C.; Atatüre, Mete (2016-09-26). "Atomically thin quantum light-emitting diodes". Nature Communications. 7 (1) 12978. Springer Science and Business Media LLC. arXiv:1603.08795. Bibcode:2016NatCo...712978P. doi:10.1038/ncomms12978. ISSN 2041-1723. PMC 5052681. PMID 27667022.
- Schulte, Carsten H. H.; Hansom, Jack; Jones, Alex E.; Matthiesen, Clemens; Le Gall, Claire; Atatüre, Mete (2015-08-31). "Quadrature squeezed photons from a two-level system". Nature. 525 (7568). Springer Science and Business Media LLC: 222–225. arXiv:1506.06827. Bibcode:2015Natur.525..222S. doi:10.1038/nature14868. ISSN 0028-0836. PMID 26322581.
- Atatüre, Mete; Dreiser, Jan; Badolato, Antonio; Imamoglu, Atac (2007-01-28). "Observation of Faraday rotation from a single confined spin". Nature Physics. 3 (2). Springer Science and Business Media LLC: 101–106. arXiv:quant-ph/0610110. Bibcode:2007NatPh...3..101A. doi:10.1038/nphys521. ISSN 1745-2473.
