= 10979 Fristephenson =

Asteroid

Discovery
- Discovered by: C. J. van Houten; I. van Houten-G. T. Gehrels
- Discovery site: Palomar Obs.
- Discovery date: 29 September 1973

Designations
- Named after: Francis Richard Stephenson (British historian of astronomy)
- Alternative designations: 4171 T-2 · 4386 T-3
- Minor planet category: main-belt · (inner); Sulamitis

Orbital characteristics
- Epoch 23 March 2018 (JD 2458200.5)
- Uncertainty parameter 0
- Observation arc: 44.52 yr (16,260 d)
- Aphelion: 2.6597 AU
- Perihelion: 2.2555 AU
- Semi-major axis: 2.4576 AU
- Eccentricity: 0.0822
- Orbital period (sidereal): 3.85 yr (1,407 d)
- Mean anomaly: 292.96°
- Mean motion: 0° 15^{m} 20.88^{s} / day
- Inclination: 5.5613°
- Longitude of ascending node: 138.32°
- Argument of perihelion: 122.19°

Physical characteristics
- Mean diameter: 5.327±0.069 km
- Geometric albedo: 0.057±0.009
- Spectral type: C (SDSS-MOC)
- Absolute magnitude (H): 15.1

10979 Fristephenson (provisional designation 4171 T-2) is a carbonaceous Sulamitis asteroid from the inner regions of the asteroid belt, approximately 5 kilometers (3.1 miles) in diameter. It was discovered during the Palomar–Leiden Trojan survey on 29 September 1973, by Ingrid and Cornelis van Houten at Leiden, and Tom Gehrels at Palomar Observatory in California, United States. The dark C-type asteroid was named for British historian of astronomy Francis Richard Stephenson.

== Orbit and classification ==
Fristephenson is a member of the Sulamitis family (408), a small family of 300 known carbonaceous asteroids named after 752 Sulamitis. It orbits the Sun in the inner main-belt at a distance of 2.3–2.7 AU once every 3 years and 10 months (1,407 days; semi-major axis of 2.46 AU). Its orbit has an eccentricity of 0.08 and an inclination of 6° with respect to the ecliptic. The body's observation arc begins at Palomar on 19 September 1973, ten days after its official discovery observation.

=== Palomar–Leiden Trojan survey ===
The survey designation "T-2" stands for the second Palomar–Leiden Trojan survey, named after the fruitful collaboration of the Palomar and Leiden Observatory during the 1960s and 1970s. Gehrels used Palomar's Samuel Oschin telescope (also known as the 48-inch Schmidt Telescope), and shipped the photographic plates to Ingrid and Cornelis van Houten at Leiden Observatory where astrometry was carried out. The trio are credited with the discovery of several thousand asteroid discoveries.

== Physical characteristics ==
Fristephenson has an absolute magnitude of 15.1. Based on the Moving Object Catalog (MOC) of the Sloan Digital Sky Survey, the asteroid has a spectral type of a carbonaceous C-type asteroid, which agrees with its classification into the Sulamitis family, as well as with its low Geometric albedo measured by the Wide-field Infrared Survey Explorer. As of 2018, no rotational lightcurve has been obtained from photometric observations. The body's rotation period, pole and shape remain unknown.

=== Diameter and albedo ===
According to the survey carried out by the NEOWISE mission of NASA's WISE telescope, Fristephenson measures 5.327 kilometers in diameter and its surface has an albedo of 0.057.

== Naming ==
This minor planet was named after Francis Richard Stephenson (born 1941), a British historian of astronomy at Durham University. The official naming citation was published by the Minor Planet Center on 26 November 2004 (M.P.C. 53174).
