= Mick Brown (physicist) =

British physicist and materials scientist

Lawrence Michael Brown FRS
- Born: 1936 (age 89–90)
- Known for: Dislocation theory and plasticity; scanning transmission electron microscopy; SuperSTEM
- Awards: Fellow of the Royal Society (1982); Guthrie Medal and Prize (2000)
- Scientific career
- Fields: Physics, materials science
- Workplaces: Cavendish Laboratory, University of Cambridge

Lawrence Michael "Mick" Brown FRS (born 1936) is a British physicist and materials scientist. He is Emeritus Professor of Physics at the University of Cambridge and is known for his research on the plastic deformation of crystalline materials and on the application of electron microscopy to materials. In 1997 he proposed the creation of a national UK facility for aberration-corrected scanning transmission electron microscopy, which was subsequently established as the SuperSTEM Laboratory at the Daresbury Laboratory.

== Education and career ==
Brown holds a B.A.Sc. degree from the University of Toronto and a PhD from the University of Birmingham, as well as MA and DSc degrees from the University of Cambridge. He worked in the Department of Physics at Cambridge (the Cavendish Laboratory), where he is now Emeritus Professor of Physics. In 2001 he was elected an emeritus fellow of Robinson College, Cambridge.

== Research ==
According to the University of Cambridge Department of Physics, Brown's research has covered the physics of deformation in crystalline materials, including plasticity, creep, fatigue and ductile fracture. He has also worked on quantitative applications of electron microscopy, including methods for measuring the strain fields associated with precipitates and dislocations, and on the energetics and growth of damage clusters in irradiated materials.

Since 2012 his publications include studies of intermittent dislocation flow, cracks and extrusions associated with persistent slip bands, and power laws in dislocation plasticity. With Lewis Lea and Andrew Jardine he co-authored a 2020 paper on self-organised criticality in the high-rate deformation of face-centred cubic metals.

== SuperSTEM ==
At the 1997 Electron Microscopy and Analysis Group (EMAG) conference in Cambridge, Brown gave a plenary lecture titled "A Synchrotron in a Microscope". In it he argued that electron energy loss spectroscopy in a dedicated scanning transmission electron microscope (STEM) could in many cases match the performance of synchrotron X-ray absorption beamlines at a much lower cost, and he urged the UK microscopy community to seek funding for a national STEM facility based on aberration correction. He suggested that such a facility could be sited at Daresbury. In the same year, Ondrej Krivanek and colleagues at Cambridge were developing a prototype aberration corrector for a STEM.

Funding for a national facility was later secured, and the SuperSTEM Laboratory was established at Daresbury in Cheshire, with Andrew Bleloch as its first director. Its first instrument was a VG HB501 STEM from the Cavendish Laboratory that had been fitted in Cambridge with an aberration corrector made by Nion, the company founded by Krivanek and Niklas Dellby, before being moved to Daresbury. In a 2017 account, Quentin Ramasse of SuperSTEM described the laboratory as the national facility established following Brown's proposal, and the Cambridge Department of Physics says Brown played a leading role in setting it up. SuperSTEM is now the UK's EPSRC National Research Facility for Advanced Electron Microscopy.

Brown co-authored a 2015 history of the Cambridge STEM aberration-correction project with Philip Batson, Niklas Dellby and Ondrej Krivanek.

== Honours ==
Brown was elected a Fellow of the Royal Society in 1982. He received the Rosenhain Medal and Prize in 1981, and the Institute of Physics's Guthrie Medal and Prize (since renamed the Michael Faraday Medal and Prize) in 2000. In 2013 he received the Cook/Ablett Award of the Institute of Materials, Minerals and Mining for his paper "Constant intermittent flow of dislocations: central problems in plasticity".

== Selected publications ==
- Brown, L. M. (1967). "A proof of Lothe's theorem". Philosophical Magazine. 15 (134): 363–370. Bibcode:1967PMag...15..363B. doi:10.1080/14786436708227708.
- Brown, L. M.; Ham, R. K. (1971). "Dislocation–particle interactions". In Kelly, A.; Nicholson, R. B. (eds.). Strengthening Methods in Crystals. Amsterdam: Elsevier.
- Ashby, M. F.; Brown, L. M. (1983). Perspectives in Creep Fracture. Pergamon Press. (editors)
- Brown, L. M. (1997). "A synchrotron in a microscope". In Rodenburg, J. M. (ed.). Electron Microscopy and Analysis 1997. Institute of Physics Conference Series. Vol. 153. London: IOP Publishing.
- Brown, L. M. (1999). "Electron Energy Loss Spectrometry in the Electron Microscope, Parts 1–3". In Rickerby, D.G.; Valdrè, G.; Valdrè, U. (eds.). Impact of Electron and Scanning Probe Microscopy on Materials Research. NATO Science Series. Vol. 364. Dordrecht: Springer. pp. 209–263. ISBN 978-0-7923-5940-1.
- Brown, L. M.; Collings, N.; Harrison, R. M.; Maynard, A. D.; Maynard, R. L., eds. (2003). Ultrafine Particles in the Atmosphere. London: Imperial College Press. ISBN 1-86094-358-6.
- Brown, L. M. (2012). "Constant intermittent flow of dislocations: central problems in plasticity". Materials Science and Technology. 28: 1209–1232.
- Brown, L.M. (2013). "Cracks and extrusions caused by persistent slip bands". Philosophical Magazine. 93 (28–30): 3809–3820. Bibcode:2013PMag...93.3809B. doi:10.1080/14786435.2013.798048.
- Brown, L. M. (2016). "Power laws in dislocation plasticity". Philosophical Magazine. 96 (26): 2696–2713. Bibcode:2016PMag...96.2696B. doi:10.1080/14786435.2016.1211330.
- Lea, Lewis; Brown, Lawrence; Jardine, Andrew (2020). "Time limited self-organised criticality in the high rate deformation of face-centred cubic metals". Communications Materials. 1: 93. doi:10.1038/s43246-020-00090-2.
