= Simon Lilly =

Simon Lilly FRS
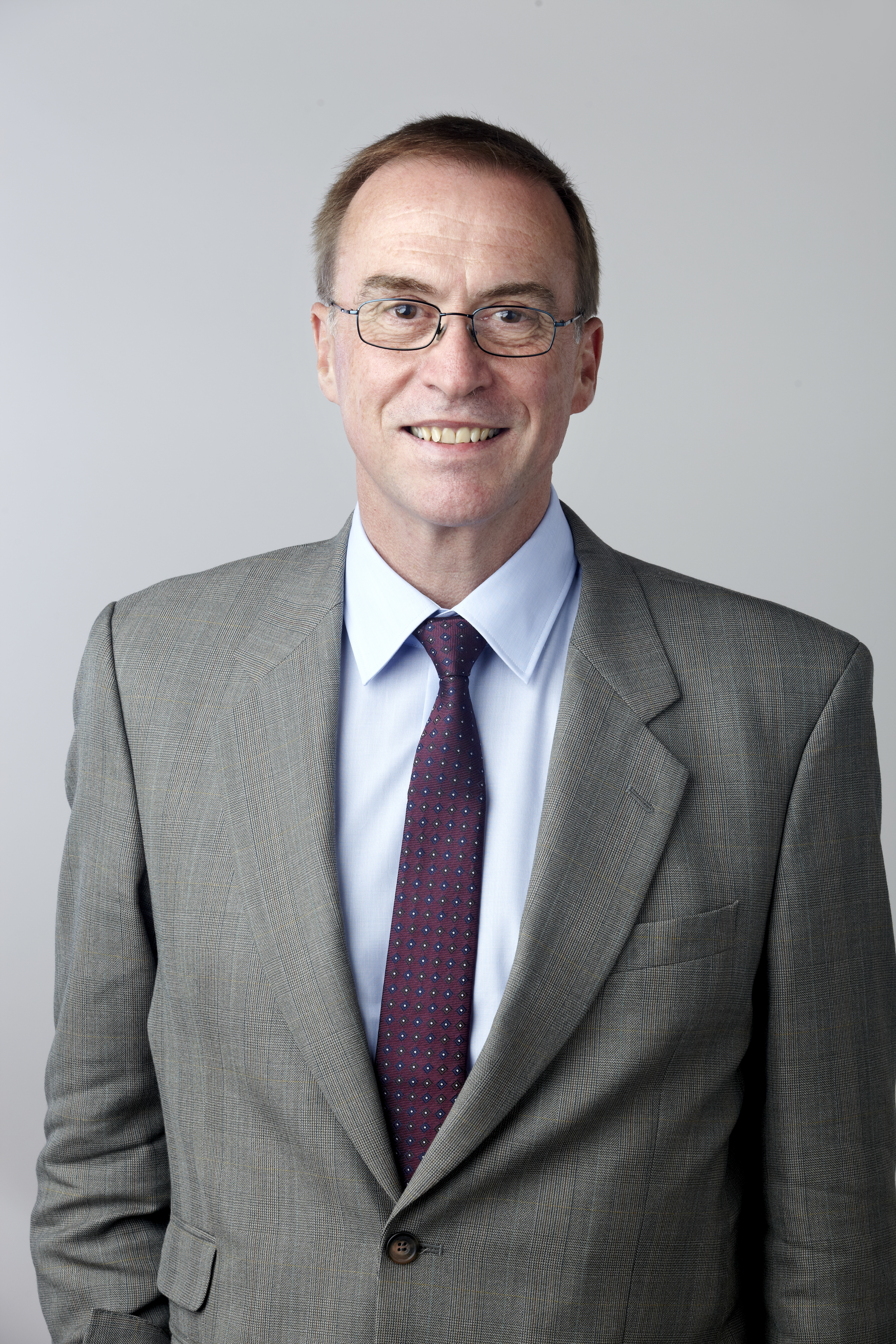
- Simon Lilly at the Royal Society admissions day in London, July 2014
- Born: Simon John Lilly; January 1, 1955 (age 71); London, UK
- Education: University of Cambridge (BA); University of Edinburgh (PhD)
- Known for: Redshift surveys; Cosmic Evolution Survey
- Spouse: Marcella Carollo
- Awards: Herschel Medal (2017)
- Scientific career
- Fields: Astronomy; Galaxy formation and evolution
- Workplaces: ETH Zürich; Herzberg Institute of Astrophysics; University of Toronto; University of Hawaii; Princeton University
- Thesis: Evolution of radio galaxies (1983)
- Doctoral advisor: Malcolm Longair
- Website: www.phys.ethz.ch/lilly/people-a-z/person-detail.html?persid=105619

Simon John Lilly FRS is a professor in the Department of Physics at ETH Zürich.

== Education ==
Lilly was educated at the University of Cambridge where he was awarded a Bachelor of Arts degree in Natural Sciences (Physics and Theoretical Physics) in 1980. He went on to study at the University of Edinburgh where he was awarded a PhD in 1983 for research on the evolution of radio galaxies supervised by Malcolm Longair.

== Career and research ==
Following his PhD, Lilly was a SERC/NATO postdoctoral research Fellow at Princeton University from 1984 to 1985. He was appointed assistant professor and then associate professor at the University of Hawaii from 1985 to 1990, then full professor at the University of Toronto from 1990 to 2000. He served as Director General of the Herzberg Institute of Astrophysics from 2000 to 2002. That year, he was appointed Professor at ETH Zurich in 2002, in a dual appointment with his wife Marcella Carollo. He served as Head of the Department of Physics at ETH from 2015 to 2017. Lilly's research investigates galaxy formation and evolution. With the zCOSMOS project, Lilly has sought to identify the physical processes that shape the properties of galaxies over cosmic time in different space environments. He is also working to find new ways of detecting the intergalactic medium — the gaseous material that galaxies form from and later exchange material with.

=== Controversy ===
In August 2017, ETH Zurich dissolved its institute for astronomy. According to news reports in NZZ am Sonntag and Science the closure of the institute followed allegations of misconduct in the Institute by Lilly's Italian-Swiss wife, Marcella Carollo. A subsequent investigation by ETH cleared Lilly of any misconduct but not Carollo, who was dismissed.

=== Awards and honours ===
Lilly was elected a Fellow of the Royal Society (FRS) in 2014, with the citation noting that his early work "provided the first convincing measurement of the star formation history of the Universe."

He was awarded the 2017 Herschel Medal by the Royal Astronomical Society, in recognition of his work on the Canada-France Redshift Survey, which "provided the first measurement of the luminosity density of normal galaxies over cosmological timescales [and] motivated the follow-up census at higher redshifts with the first Hubble Deep Field."

In 2017 and again in 2018, he was identified as a Highly Cited Researcher for his research work at ETH.
