= International Life Sciences Institute =

Nonprofit organization

- Nickname: ILSI
- Formation: 7 July 1978; 48 years ago
- Headquarters: 740 15th Street, Suite 600; Washington, DC 20005; United States
- Coordinates: 38°53′59.7″N 77°2′2.1″W
- Website: ilsi.org

The International Life Sciences Institute (ILSI) is a global nonprofit 501(c)(3) organization headquartered in Washington, DC, United States that publishes peer-reviewed studies on nutrition and food safety. It was founded in 1978 by Alex Malaspina, a former Coca-Cola executive (who was affiliated with ILSI until 2001), and it is partially financed by its 300+ members, which has included food and chemical corporations such as BASF, McDonald's, Syngenta and Pepsi. In 2020, the organization's revenue was US$10.1 million.

In 2021 ILSI North America rebranded as the Institute for the Advancement of Food and Nutrition Sciences (IAFNS).

== Structure ==
Until 2018, ILSI operated as a member organization, whose members were exclusively food and beverage, agricultural, chemical, and pharmaceutical companies. In November 2018, ILSI restructured as a global federation of entities, consisting of non-profit organizations with public and private sector members. Based on its 2020 annual report, 70.8% of its revenue comes from membership dues and committee assessments; 19.2% from grants and contributions; and the remaining from publications and conference registration.

According to ILSI's bylaws, at least 51% of its Board of Trustees must come from the public sector (i.e. academic, government and non-governmental organization representatives). The remainder of the Board is elected from its member companies.

According to ILSI, the organization receives in-kind support of time and expertise from volunteer academic, government, and non-governmental scientists.

== History ==
ILSI was formed in 1978 by Alex Malaspina, who was concurrently a senior vice president at Coca-Cola from 1969 until leaving both Coca-Cola and the institute in 2001.

In 1986, ILSI employee Michael Gough published a book about dioxin and Agent Orange entitled Dioxin, Agent Orange: The Facts. The Los Angeles Times said that The Facts had "minimal scientific merit" as the book is about "toxicology, teratology, carcinogenesis, epidemiology and medicine"—areas where Gough had no authority as his qualifications were in molecular biology. The Times said that The Facts would however be useful to "dioxin defense attorneys, his current employers at the Risk Science Institute of the International Life Sciences Institute in Washington (a chemical industry think tank), and also his future industrial clients."

in 2009, partly in response to questions about the neutrality of its science, ILSI published an article "Funding Food Science and Nutrition Research: Financial Conflicts and Scientific Integrity" in The American Journal of Clinical Nutrition, proposing eight conflict-of-interest guidelines regarding industry funding "to protect the integrity and credibility of the scientific record, particularly with respect to health, nutrition and food-safety science".

In 2015, ILSI Mexico's operations were suspended for a year by the Board Executive Committee when it was discovered ILSI Mexico had sponsored a local conference where soft drink taxation was discussed, which was viewed as a "public relations effort to influence policy for commercial purposes" by the institute. ILSI Mexico was shut down in 2020.

In 2018, Mars Inc ended their membership in ILSI, and in 2021, Coca-Cola Co. also withdrew from membership.

In 2021, ILSI North America rebranded as the "Institute for the Advancement of Food and Nutrition Sciences" (IAFNS).

ILSI Global was awarded Guidestar's Gold Seal of Transparency in 2021, though Guidestar's transparency and evaluation for these ratings has been criticized. ILSI Europe is included in European Union's Transparency Register. ILSI Mesoamerica is certified by the Costa Rican government as an organization of public interest.

== Controversies ==
A 2021 qualitative document analysis concluded that "The activities developed by ILSI on scientific integrity principles are part of a broader set of political practices of industry actors to influence public health policy, research, and practice."

=== Tobacco industry ===
In 2001, an editorial in the British Medical Journal wrote that ILSI received money from the tobacco industry from 1983 to 1998. ILSI denies accusations that it has ever sought to undermine tobacco control efforts. In a Letter to the American Journal of Public Health, ILSI responded to these allegations by saying that there is "little question that the tobacco industry has engaged in a variety of tactics to thwart public health efforts… As a scientific organization, ILSI deplores these tactics and is strongly against any attempts to twist and manipulate science." In 2015 the World Health Organization distanced itself from ILSI. As of 2019, ILSI entities are prohibited from accepting as members or accepting funds from tobacco companies.

A 2019 Guardian article quoted researcher Dr. Sarah Steele as saying "ILSI should be regarded as an industry group". A 2019 New York Times article described ILSI as an organization 'which championed tobacco interests during the 1980s and 1990s.'

=== Nutrition ===
Nutritionist Barry Popkin says that in China ILSI had "an extremely harmful influence, because they prevented raising awareness for a healthy diet."

=== Sugar industry ===
In January 2020, an ILSI-sponsored survey report by Indian Council of Medical Research (ICMR) and National Institute of Nutrition (NIN) on consumption of added sugar among Indians, drew criticism from the Alliance Against Conflict of Interest (AACI). They described ILSI as a lobbying arm of the food industry, notorious for pursuing policy influence globally, with particular respect to sugary foods and beverages. As such, ILSI was accused of influencing the decisions of WHO and governments in their favour. The AACI "wonder[s] what strategic direction ICMR-NIN, the premier research agency of India, is giving to the people of India when this survey's findings projected in the media may potentially perpetuate more sugar consumption while pretending to be concerned about non-communicable diseases".
