= Andrew D. Maynard =

British journalist

Andrew Maynard
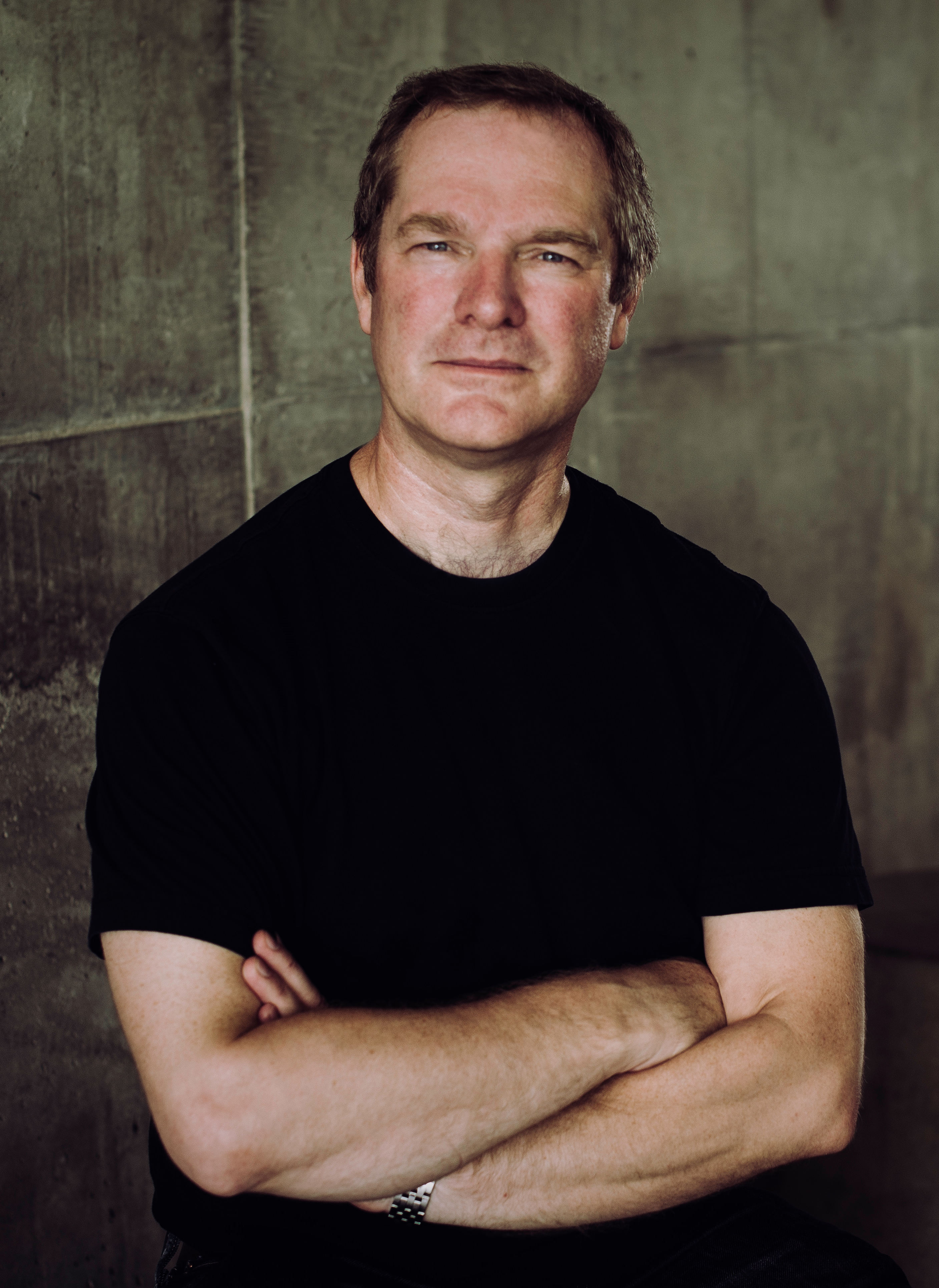
- Andrew Maynard in 2018
- Born: October 6, 1965 (age 60); Preston, Lancashire
- Citizenship: United States
- Education: University of Birmingham (BSc); University of Cambridge (PhD)
- Scientific career
- Fields: Emerging technologies Responsible innovation Risk; Risk innovation Nanotechnology
- Institutions: Arizona State University; University of Michigan
- Thesis: The collection and analytical electron microscopy of ultrafine aerosol particles (1992)
- Website: isearch.asu.edu/profile/2670673

Andrew David Maynard is an author, professor, and director of the Risk Innovation Lab at the School for the Future of Innovation in Society (SFIS) at Arizona State University (ASU). Maynard was previously the director of the University of Michigan Risk Science Center and served as Science Advisor to the Project on Emerging Nanotechnologies at the Woodrow Wilson International Center for Scholars. His work focuses on the socially responsive and responsible development of emerging and converging technologies.

== Education ==
Maynard earned his Bachelor of Science in physics from the University of Birmingham in 1987. In 1992, he received a PhD in aerosol physics from the University of Cambridge, based on his research into analyzing airborne nanoparticles at the Cavendish Laboratory.

== Career and research ==
Between 1992 and 1999, Maynard led research at the UK Health and Safety Executive on occupational aerosol exposure. In January 2000, he moved to the US National Institute for Occupational Safety and Health (NIOSH) at the Centers for Disease Control (CDC), to develop a program of research into the potential health effects of engineered nanomaterials.

In the early 2000s Maynard represented NIOSH on the National Nanotechnology Initiative (NNI) - a US interagency initiative established to advance nanotechnology research and support the responsible development and use of the technology—and between 2004-2005 he served as co-chair of the NNI Nanotechnology Environmental and Health Impacts interagency working group.

In 2005 Maynard became Chief Science Advisor for the Project on Emerging Nanotechnologies at the Woodrow Wilson International Center for Scholars, and in his time in this role, helped inform national and global initiatives addressing the responsible development of nanotechnology.

In 2010, he moved to the University of Michigan as the Charles and Rita Gelman Professor of Risk Science in the School of Public Health. Between 2012-2014 he was Chair of the department of Environmental Health Sciences at the University of Michigan.

In 2015, Maynard joined the faculty of the School for the Future of Innovation in Society (SFIS) at Arizona State University, where he is chair of the Master of Science and Technology program, and Director of the Risk innovation Lab.

Maynard has published over 150 scholarly papers, book chapters and books. His scholarly work spans physics and nanotechnology, to toxicology, risk perception, governance, and policy. Many of Maynard's publications address the potential risks and the responsible use of nanotechnology.

Maynard's later academic publications have focused on the responsible development of emerging technologies more broadly. Between 2014-2016 he published a regular column in the journal Nature that explored the broader societal challenges and opportunities of nanotechnology, and emerging technologies.

=== Congressional testimony ===
In September 2006, Maynard testified before the US House of Representatives Committee on Science on Research on Environmental and Safety Impacts of Nanotechnology. This was followed by invited testimony to the US House of Representatives Committee on Science and Technology, Subcommittee on Research and Science Education in October 2007, and again in 2008.

=== Service and leadership ===
Maynard has been involved with the World Economic Forum since 2008, through the Forum's Global Agenda Councils and Global Future Councils, and the Forum's Technology Pioneers. Between 2010-2011 he chaired the Forum Global Agenda Council on Emerging Technologies, and between 2014-2016 he was co-chair of the Global Agenda Council on Nanotechnology. He is currently a member of the Forum's Global Future Council on Agile Governance.

Maynard became a member of the Board of Trustees of the International Life Sciences Institute North America in 2012. He has served on the President's Research Council of the Canadian Institute for Advanced Research (CIFAR) since 2017.

Maynard has also served on three National Academies of Science (NAS) committees. These have reviewed nanotechnology environment, health and safety research funded by the US government, a strategy for nanotechnology safety research, and the science of science communication. He contributed to a NAS review and assessment of planetary protection policy development processes, and was a reviewer for the 2017 NAS report on human genome editing.

=== Public engagement ===
Maynard writes regularly for the news platform The Conversation about technology and society. Huffington Post, the Australian Broadcasting Company, Salon, Phys.org, Slate, Popular Science, the Daily Mail, the San Francisco Chronicle, Scientific American, Marketwatch, the Houston Chronicle, and IFL Science have published articles by him. As of 2021 YouTube channel RiskBites, has over 20,000 subscribers.

In 2007, Maynard started the blog 2020 Science; a blog that focuses on emerging technologies, and their relationship with society.

Maynard's first popular science and technology book, Films from the Future: The Technology and Morality of Sci-Fi Movies, was to be published by Mango Press in fall 2018.

He cohosts the podcast Mission: Interplanetary.
