= Nicola Marzari =

Computational materials scientist and condensed-matter physicist

- Education: University of Trieste; University of Cambridge
- Scientific career
- Fields: Computational materials science, condensed-matter physics
- Workplaces: University of Cambridge; École polytechnique fédérale de Lausanne; University of Oxford; MIT

Nicola Marzari is a computational materials scientist and condensed-matter physicist known for his contributions to electronic-structure theory, transport theories, data-intensive materials discovery, and open research infrastructures. He is the Cavendish Professor of Physics at the University of Cambridge,.

== Education and career ==
Marzari received a Laurea in physics from the University of Trieste and a PhD in physics from the University of Cambridge. He held the Toyota Chair for Materials Processing at the Massachusetts Institute of Technology, where he was on the faculty from 2001 to 2011, and was the inaugural Statutory Chair of Materials Modelling at the University of Oxford (UK), where he also directed the Materials Modelling Laboratory in 2010–11. He joined EPFL in 2011 as Chair of Theory and Simulation of Materials and has been then founding director of the Swiss National Centre of Competence in Research MARVEL.

== Research ==
=== Maximally localized Wannier functions ===
Marzari and David Vanderbilt introduced the method of maximally localized Wannier functions (MLWFs), widely used to analyse and model the electronic structure of solids and nanostructures, including the extension to entangled bands.

=== Koopmans spectral functionals ===
Building on the idea that approximate DFT should satisfy a generalized Koopmans' condition (piecewise linearity of the total energy with respect to fractional occupations of any orbital), Marzari and collaborators introduced and developed Koopmans-compliant functionals—orbital-density–dependent functionals that correct self-interaction and deliver accurate spectral properties while retaining a variational total-energy framework. Subsequent work extended the approach to extended systems and periodic boundary conditions and led to a community software stack and benchmarks, establishing Koopmans functionals as a practical, accurate route to quasiparticle spectra for molecules, solids and disordered phases.

=== Microscopic theories of transport ===
In heat transport, Marzari's groups introduced relaxons—the exact kinetic eigenmodes that carry heat in crystals—clarifying hydrodynamic regimes and momentum-conserving scattering within the phonon Boltzmann equation. They later derived, from the Wigner phase-space formulation of quantum mechanics, a unified transport equation that seamlessly recovers the Peierls (crystals) and Allen–Feldman (glasses) limits and the intermediate regimes. This framework led to a generalization of Fourier's law into viscous heat equations, introducing the notion of thermal viscosity that governs fluid-like heat flow in the hydrodynamic regime. A subsequent article formalized the Wigner heat-transport equation and its foundations.

=== Open research infrastructures ===
He been involved in the development of open, FAIR infrastructures for computational materials science and they application to data-intensive materials discovery: AiiDA for workflows and provenance and the Materials Cloud for dissemination.

== Selected publications ==
- Marzari, Nicola; Vanderbilt, David (1997). "Maximally localized generalized Wannier functions for composite energy bands". Physical Review B. 56 (20): 12847–12865. arXiv:cond-mat/9707145. Bibcode:1997PhRvB..5612847M. doi:10.1103/PhysRevB.56.12847.
- Souza, Ivo; Marzari, Nicola; Vanderbilt, David (2001). "Maximally localized Wannier functions for entangled energy bands". Physical Review B. 65 (3) 035109. arXiv:cond-mat/0108084. Bibcode:2001PhRvB..65c5109S. doi:10.1103/PhysRevB.65.035109.
- Marzari, Nicola; Mostofi, Arash A.; Yates, Jonathan R.; Souza, Ivo; Vanderbilt, David (2012). "Maximally localized Wannier functions: Theory and applications". Reviews of Modern Physics. 84 (4): 1419–1475. arXiv:1112.5411. Bibcode:2012RvMP...84.1419M. doi:10.1103/RevModPhys.84.1419.
- Mostofi, Arash A.; Yates, Jonathan R.; Lee, Young-Su; Souza, Ivo; Vanderbilt, David; Marzari, Nicola (2014). "An updated version of wannier90: a tool for obtaining maximally-localised Wannier functions" (PDF). Computer Physics Communications. 185 (8): 2309–2310. Bibcode:2014CoPhC.185.2309M. doi:10.1016/j.cpc.2014.05.003. hdl:10261/136867.
- Pizzi, Giovanni; Vitale, Valerio; Arita, Ryotaro; Blügel, Stefan; Freimuth, Frank; others (2020). "Wannier90 as a community code: new features and applications". Journal of Physics: Condensed Matter. 32 (16): 165902. arXiv:1907.09788. Bibcode:2020JPCM...32p5902P. doi:10.1088/1361-648X/ab51ff. PMID 31658458.
- Dabo, Ismaila; Ferretti, Andrea; Poilvert, Nicolas; Li, Yanli; Marzari, Nicola; Cococcioni, Matteo (2010). "Koopmans' condition for density-functional theory". Physical Review B. 82 (11) 115121. arXiv:1008.1934. Bibcode:2010PhRvB..82k5121D. doi:10.1103/PhysRevB.82.115121.
- Borghi, Giovanni; Ferretti, Andrea; Nguyen, Ngoc Linh; Dabo, Ismaila; Marzari, Nicola (2014). "Koopmans-compliant functionals and their performance against reference molecular data". Physical Review B. 90 (7) 075135. arXiv:1405.4635. Bibcode:2014PhRvB..90g5135B. doi:10.1103/PhysRevB.90.075135.
- Nguyen, Ngoc Linh; Colonna, Nicola; Ferretti, Andrea; Marzari, Nicola (2018). "Koopmans-Compliant Spectral Functionals for Extended Systems". Physical Review X. 8 (2) 021051. arXiv:1708.08518. Bibcode:2018PhRvX...8b1051N. doi:10.1103/PhysRevX.8.021051.
- Colonna, Nicola; Nguyen, Ngoc Linh; Ferretti, Andrea; Marzari, Nicola (2022). "Koopmans spectral functionals in periodic-boundary conditions". Journal of Chemical Theory and Computation. 18 (6): 3907–3923. doi:10.1021/acs.jctc.2c00161. PMID 35924825.
- Linscott, Edward B.; Colonna, Nicola; De Gennaro, Riccardo; Nguyen, Ngoc Linh; Borghi, Giovanni; Ferretti, Andrea; Dabo, Ismaila; Marzari, Nicola (2023). "koopmans: An Open-Source Package for Accurately and Efficiently Predicting Spectral Properties with Koopmans Functionals". Journal of Chemical Theory and Computation. 19 (24): 8357–8372. doi:10.1021/acs.jctc.3c00652. PMC 10601481. PMID 37610300.
- Cepellotti, Andrea; Marzari, Nicola (2016). "Thermal Transport in Crystals as a Kinetic Theory of Relaxons". Physical Review X. 6 (4) 041013. arXiv:1603.02608. Bibcode:2016PhRvX...6d1013C. doi:10.1103/PhysRevX.6.041013.
- Simoncelli, Michele; Marzari, Nicola; Mauri, Francesco (2019). "Unified theory of thermal transport in crystals and glasses". Nature Physics. 15 (8): 809–813. arXiv:1901.01964. Bibcode:2019NatPh..15..809S. doi:10.1038/s41567-019-0520-x.
- Simoncelli, Michele; Cepellotti, Andrea; Marzari, Nicola; Mauri, Francesco (2020). "Generalization of Fourier's Law into Viscous Heat Equations". Physical Review X. 10 (1) 011019. arXiv:1906.09743. Bibcode:2020PhRvX..10a1019S. doi:10.1103/PhysRevX.10.011019.
- Simoncelli, Michele; Mauri, Francesco; Marzari, Nicola (2022). "Wigner formulation of thermal transport in solids". Physical Review X. 12 (4) 041011. arXiv:2112.06897. Bibcode:2022PhRvX..12d1011S. doi:10.1103/PhysRevX.12.041011.

== Awards ==
- Fellow of the American Physical Society.
- 2022 PRACE HPC Excellence Award.
- 2023 National Prize for Open Research Data – special acknowledgement by the jury (Swiss Academies of Arts and Sciences).
- 2025 Feynman Prize (Theory), Foresight Institute.
- 2026 David Adler Lectureship Award, American Physical Society.
