= Roger Coleman (professor) =

Roger Coleman (born 1943) is Professor Emeritus at the Royal College of Art and a pioneer of inclusive design.

In 1999, Professor Coleman founded DesignAge and was the programme's director until its merger in 1999 with the Helen Hamlyn Research Centre, which he co-founded and co-directed until 2006.

Professor Coleman was a recipient of the Ron Mace Designing for the 21st Century Award in 2000, the Sir Misha Black Award for Innovation in Design Education in 2001, and an honorary doctorate from KU Leuven in 2012.
