= Stephen Gull =

British physicist

- Occupation: physicist

Stephen Gull is a British physicist based at St John's College, Cambridge credited, together with Anthony N. Lasenby, Joan Lasenby and Chris J. L. Doran, with raising the interest of the physics community to the mathematical language and methods of geometric algebra and geometric calculus. These have been rediscovered and refined by David Hestenes, who built on the fundamental work of William Kingdon Clifford and Hermann Grassmann. In 1998, together with Lasenby and Doran, he proposed gauge theory gravity.

== See also ==
- Bell's theorem
