= Arthur Schuster =

Anglo-German physicist (1851–1934)

Sir Arthur Schuster FRS FRSE
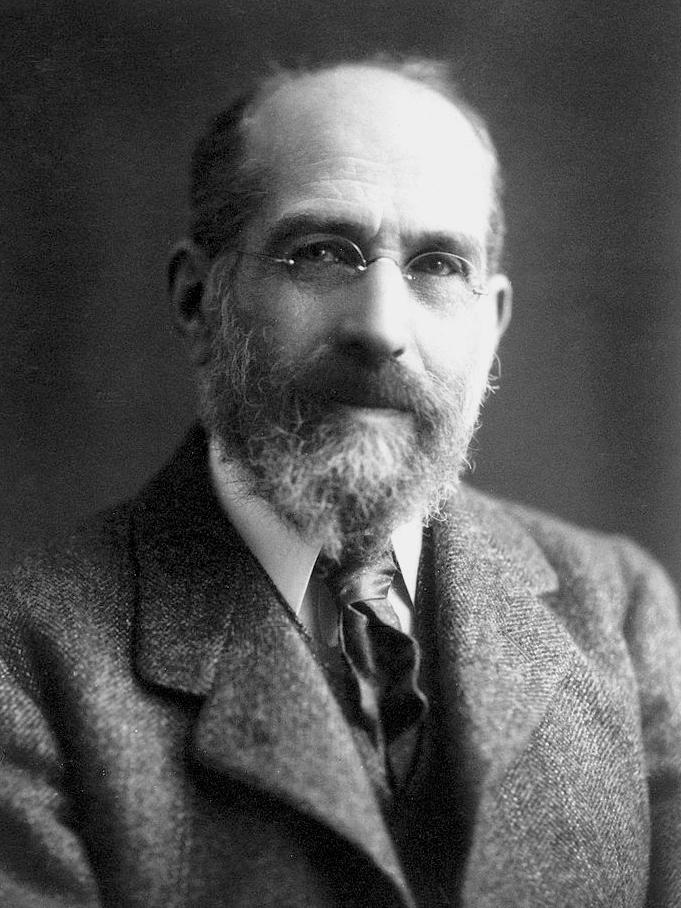
- Born: Franz Arthur Friedrich Schuster; 12 September 1851; Frankfurt am Main, German Confederation
- Died: 14 October 1934 (aged 83); Yeldall Manor, Berkshire, England
- Education: University of Heidelberg
- Awards: FRS (1879); Royal Medal (1893); Rumford Medal (1926); Copley Medal (1931)
- Scientific career
- Academic advisors: Wilhelm Eduard Weber

Sir Franz Arthur Friedrich Schuster (12 September 1851 – 14 October 1934) was a German-born British physicist known for his work in spectroscopy, electrochemistry, optics, X-radiography and the application of harmonic analysis to physics. Schuster's integral is named after him. He contributed to making the University of Manchester a centre for the study of physics.

== Early years ==
Arthur Schuster was born in Frankfurt am Main, Germany the son of Francis Joseph Schuster, a cotton merchant and banker, and his wife Marie Pfeiffer.

Schuster's parents were married in 1849, converted from Judaism to Christianity, and brought up their children in that faith. In 1869, his father moved to Manchester, where the family textile business was based. Arthur, who had been to school in Frankfurt and was studying in Geneva, joined his parents in 1870, and he and the other children became British citizens in 1875.

From his childhood, Schuster had been interested in science, and after working for a year (1870/71) for the family firm of Schuster Brothers in Manchester, he persuaded his father to let him study at Owens College. He studied mathematics under Thomas Barker and physics under Balfour Stewart, and began research with Henry Roscoe on the spectra of hydrogen and nitrogen. He was elected to membership of the Manchester Literary and Philosophical Society on 18 November 1873. and President of the Society 1892–94, Secretary 1885–88. He spent a year with Gustav Kirchhoff at the University of Heidelberg, and having gained his PhD, returned to Owens as an unpaid demonstrator in physics. Schuster later used his family's wealth to buy material and equipment and to endow readerships in mathematical physics at Manchester and meteorology at the University of Cambridge. He also contributed to the Royal Society and the International Union for Co-operation in Solar Research.

After a further period of study in Germany with Wilhelm Eduard Weber and Hermann von Helmholtz, he returned to England, where his knowledge of spectrum analysis led to him being appointed to lead an expedition to Siam, to photograph the coronal spectrum during the total solar eclipse of 6 April 1875. This was an important appointment for such a junior scientist. On the way, he wrote a letter dated 21 February 1875, to Nature describing his observation of the "green flash" phenomenon.

== Career and later life ==
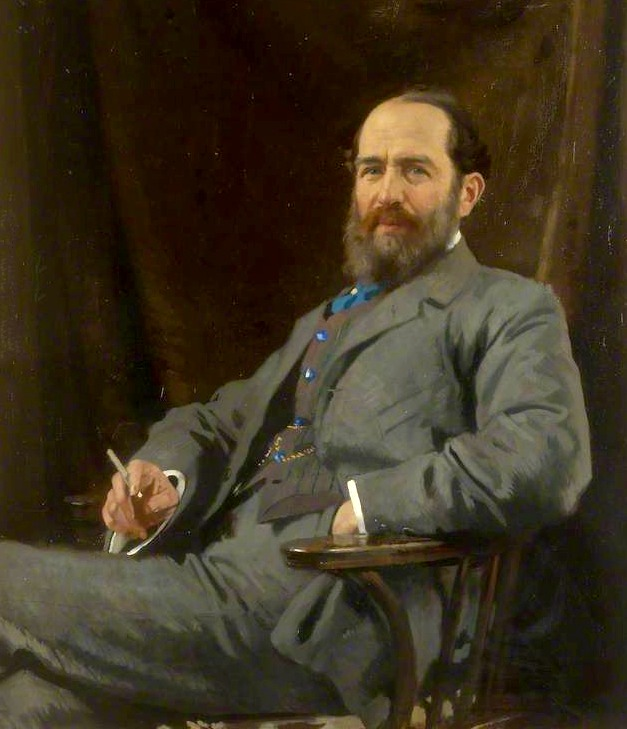
Arthur Schuster by William Orpen, 1912

Schuster at the Fourth Conference International Union for Cooperation in Solar Research at Mount Wilson Observatory, 1910

On his return to Manchester in 1875, he began research on electricity and then went on to spend five years at the Cavendish Laboratory of the University of Cambridge. His status there was quite unofficial; he was neither a student nor a fellow. He worked with James Clerk Maxwell and with Rayleigh. In 1881, he was appointed to the Beyer Chair of Applied Mathematics at Owens, by now one of the colleges of the new Victoria University. He succeeded his teacher, Balfour Stewart, as professor of physics in 1888. This appointment gave him the opportunity to establish a large, active teaching and research department. In 1900, a new laboratory, for which he had fought and which he had designed, was officially opened. It was the fourth largest in the world. The laboratory quickly became a serious rival to the Cavendish; see Manchester Science Hall of Fame. Much of this later fame was associated with Ernest Rutherford, who succeeded Schuster as Langworthy Professor in 1907. Schuster resigned from the chair, partly for health reasons and partly to promote the cause of international science. He ensured that Rutherford would succeed him.

Schuster is credited with coining the concept of antimatter in two letters to Nature in 1898. He hypothesized antiatoms and whole antimatter solar systems, which would yield energy if the atoms combined with atoms of normal matter. His hypothesis was given a mathematical foundation by the work of Paul Dirac in 1928, which predicted antiparticles and later led to their discovery.

Schuster is perhaps most widely remembered for his periodogram analysis, a technique which was long the main practical tool for identifying statistically important frequencies present in a time series of observations. He first used this form of harmonic analysis in 1897 to disprove C. G. Knott's claim of periodicity in earthquake occurrences. He went on to apply the technique to analysing sunspot activity. This was an old interest. In 1875, Stewart's friend and Roscoe's cousin, the economist Jevons, reported, "Mr. A Schuster of Owens College has ingeniously pointed out that the periods of good vintage in Western Europe have occurred at intervals somewhat approximating to eleven years, the average length of the principal sun-spot cycle."

Schuster is credited by Chandrasekhar to have given a fresh start to the radiative transfer problem. Schuster formulated in 1905 a problem in radiative transfer in an attempt to explain the appearance of absorption and emission lines in stellar spectra. This was the first use of the two-stream approximation that underpins the treatment of radiative transfer in virtually all weather and climate models.

In 1912 he bought Yeldall Manor at Hare Hatch near Wargrave in Berkshire.

In 1913, Schuster was elected to both the United States National Academy of Sciences and the American Philosophical Society.

Following the outbreak of World War I in 1914, the Schuster family was subjected to anti-German prejudice in the press and, in Arthur's case, in some quarters of the Royal Society. His brother, Sir Felix Schuster, had to issue a statement pointing out the family's loyalty to Britain and that they all had sons serving in the British army. On the day Arthur gave his presidential address to the 1915 British Association meeting, he learned that his son had been wounded.

Schuster was regarded by his contemporaries as a mathematical physicist of exceptional ability but also as a capable administrator and teacher, and an advocate for the role of science in education and industry.

He died in Hare Hatch on 14 October 1934. He is buried in Brookwood Cemetery in outer London.

== Family ==
In 1887, he married Caroline Loveday.

Edgar Schuster (1897–1969), the first Galton Fellow of Eugenics at University College London, was his nephew.

== Honours and awards ==
Schuster was elected to membership of the Manchester Literary and Philosophical Society on 18 November 1873, President of the Society 1892–94 and Secretary 1885–88

Schuster was elected a Fellow of the Royal Society (FRS) in 1879, and knighted in the 1920 New Year Honours. Other honours include doctorates from the universities of Calcutta (1908), Geneva (1909), St Andrews (1911), and Oxford (1917) and the award of the Royal, Rumford and Copley medals of the Royal Society (1893, 1926 and 1931); LLD, Calcutta, 1876;

Schuster served as secretary of the Royal Society and was elected vice-president (1919–20) and foreign secretary (1920–24). He also served as secretary of the International Research Council (1919–28) and on the management committees for the Meteorological Office (1905–32) and National Physical Laboratory (1899–1902, 1920–25).

He was knighted by King George V in 1920.

The University of Manchester's Schuster Laboratory, home to the School of Physics and Astronomy, is named after him.

== Gallery ==
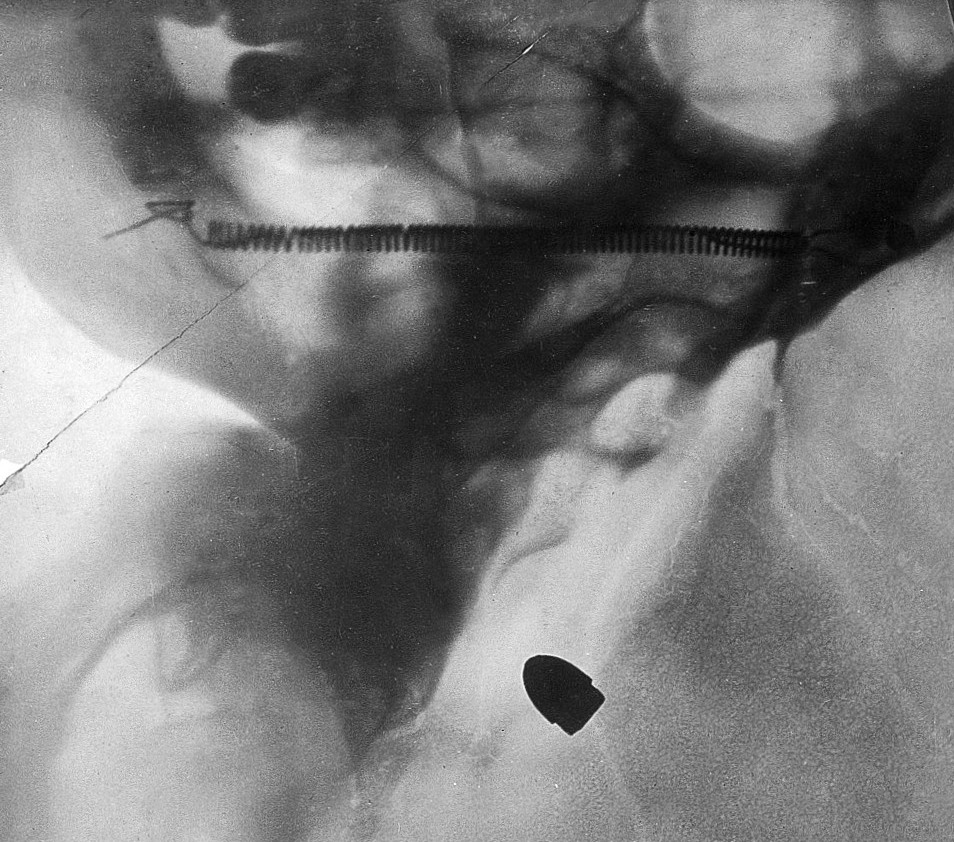
A bullet in the base of a brain, radiograph by Arthur Schuster, c. 1895

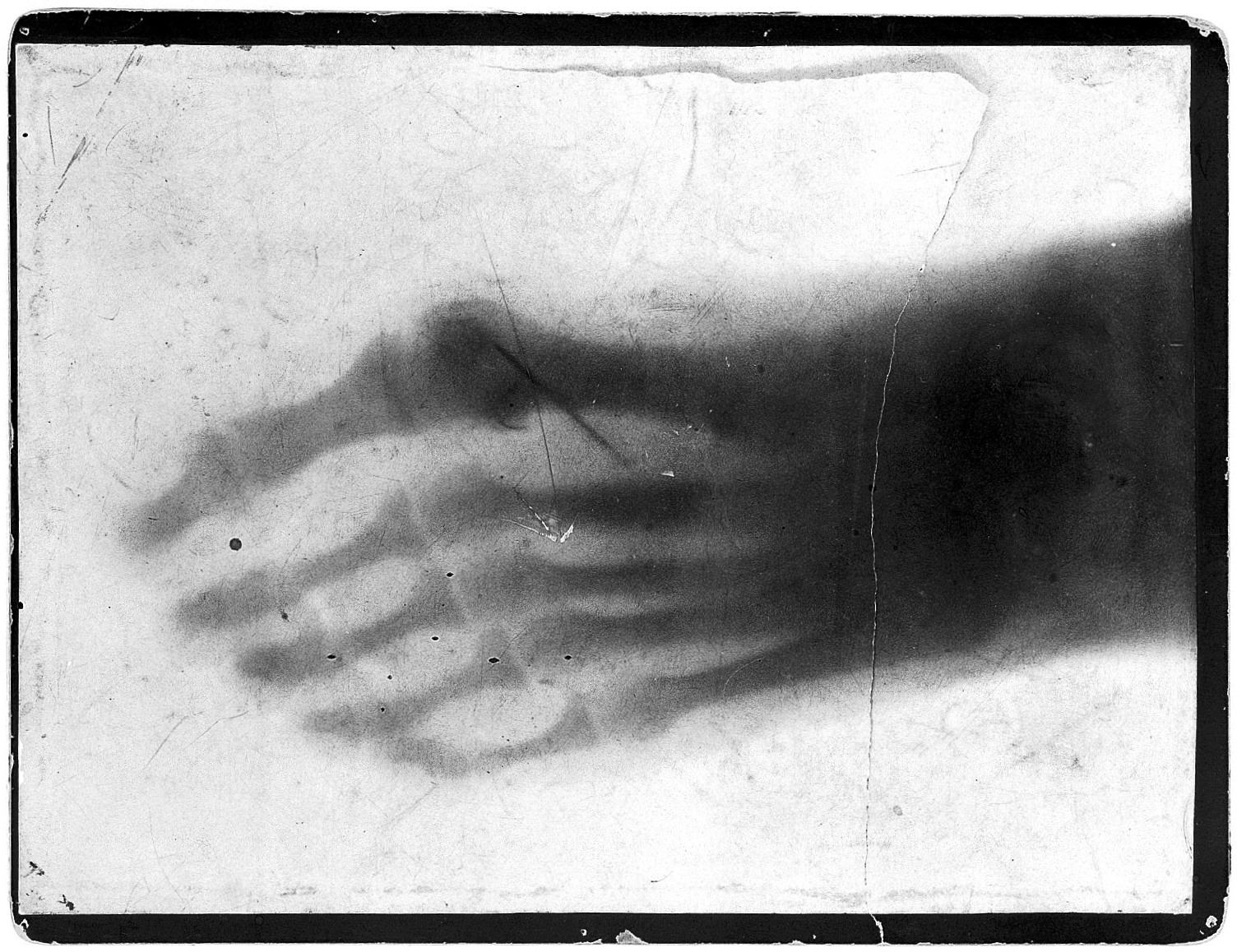
Radiograph of a pantomime artist's foot, revealing a needle by one of the toes, c. 1895

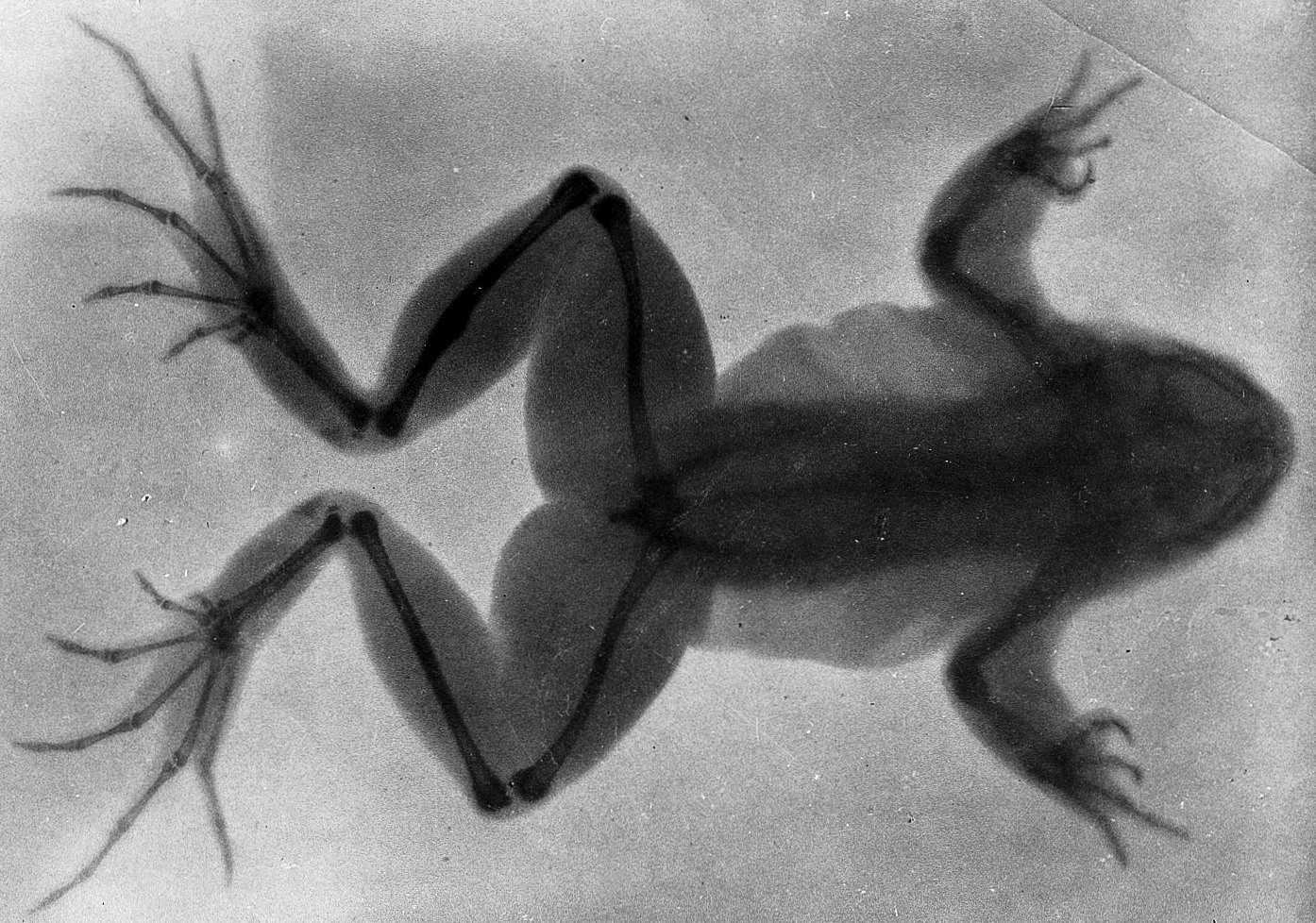
A frog with a broken leg that has healed, shown at Manchester on 3 March 1896

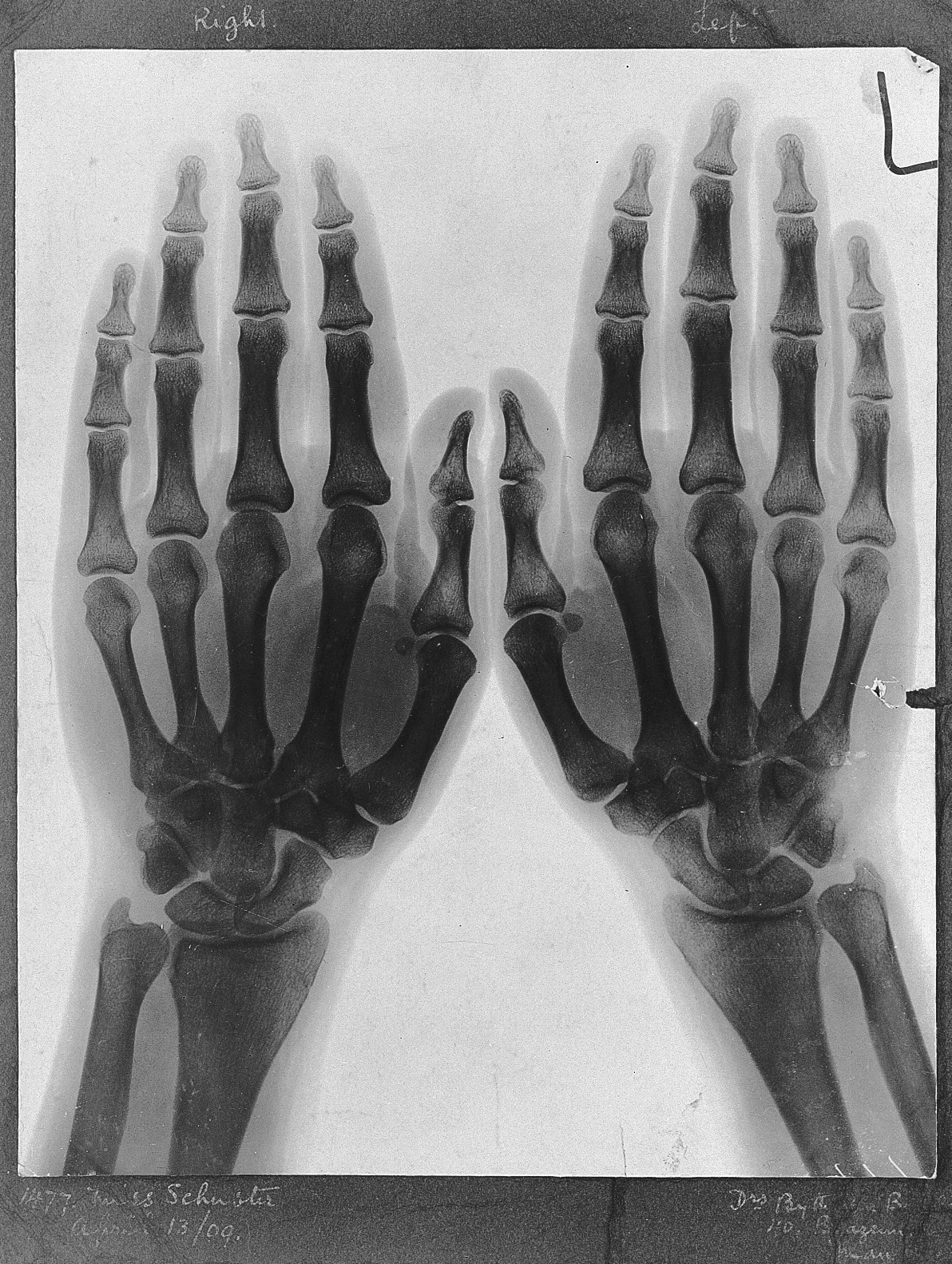
Radiograph of hands by Arthur Schuster

== Publications ==
- Schuster, Arthur (January 1905). "Radiation Through a Foggy Atmosphere". The Astrophysical Journal. 21: 1. Bibcode:1905ApJ....21....1S. doi:10.1086/141186. ISSN 0004-637X.
- The Progress of Physics (1910) Four lectures delivered to the University of Calcutta during March 1908, which give cautious provisional approval of Albert Einstein's Special Relativity and Max Planck's initial ideas about Quanta.
- An introduction to the theory of optics (1904) There are two subsequent editions to this book, and Schuster is the author. Edition two was published in 1909, and edition three appears to have two publication dates of 1924 and 1928.

== See also ==
- Blackett effect
- Diffuse reflectance spectroscopy
- Electron
- Electron rest mass
- Representative layer theory
- Sharp series
- Space weather

Educational offices
Preceded by T. Barker	Beyer Chair of Applied Mathematics at University of Manchester; 1881–1888	Succeeded by Horace Lamb
Preceded by Balfour Stewart	Langworthy Professor at University of Manchester; 1887–1907	Succeeded by Ernest Rutherford
Professional and academic associations
Preceded by Henry Edward Schunck	President of the Manchester Literary and Philosophical Society; 1892–94	Succeeded by Henry Wilde
Preceded by Osborne Reynolds	Secretary of the Manchester Literary and Philosophical Society; 1885–88	Succeeded by Frederick James Faraday
