= Hiding power =

Property of paint

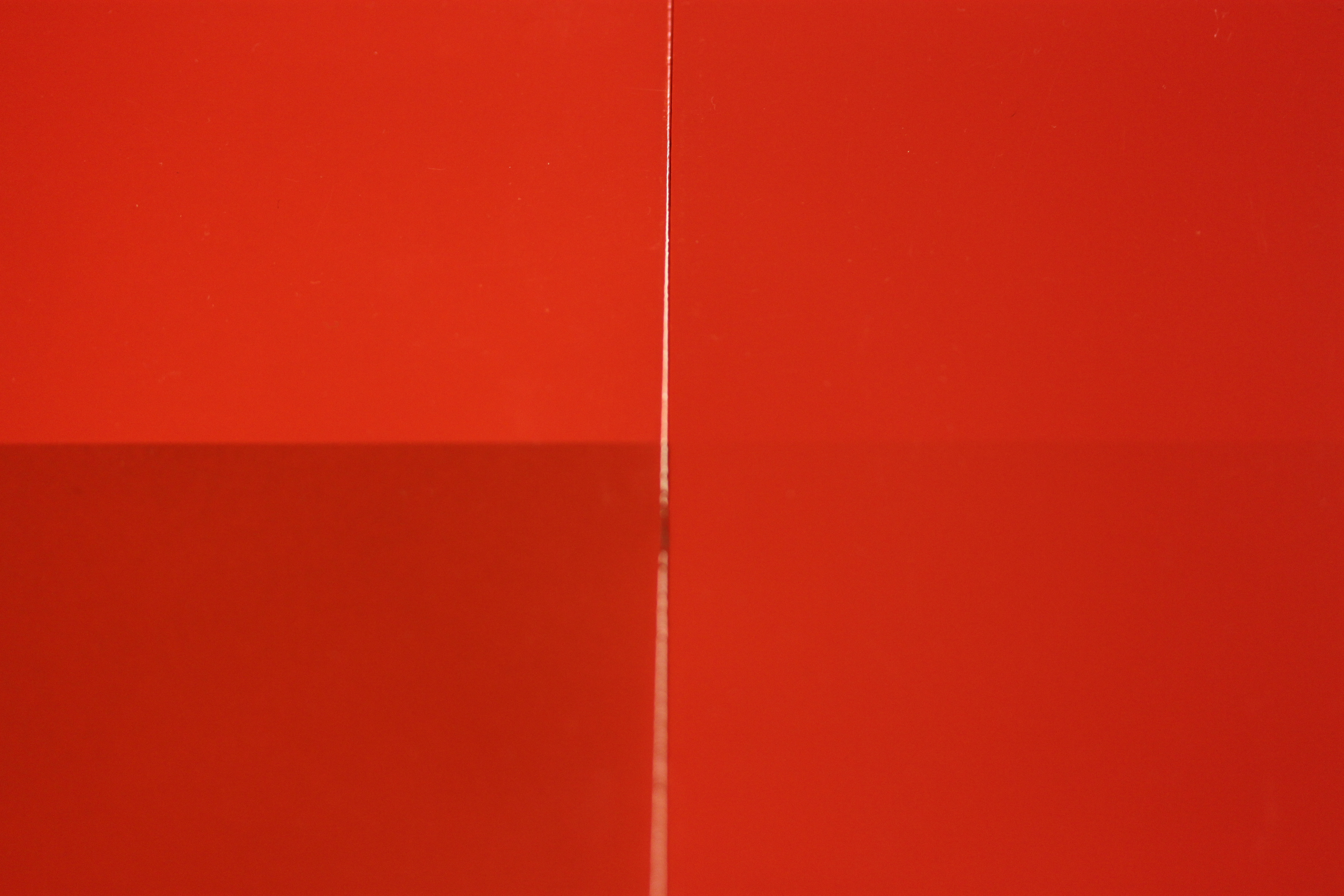
Two red pigments are used to coat two vertical panels, both black at the bottom and white at the top. The paint layer on the right panel has higher hiding, making the black and white grounds almost indistinguishable.

The hiding power is an ability of a paint to hide the surface that the paint was applied to. Numerically, it is defined as an area of surface coated by a volume of paint (spreading rate) at which the "complete hiding" of the underlying surface occurs.

== Causes ==
Whenever light is shone onto a paint-coated surface, it is partially reflected and absorbed by the coating. Once the light reaches the underlying surface (substrate), it is again reflected and absorbed by the substrate, the process happens once more as the reflected light travels back through the paint layer. Depending on the paint properties, the information about the substrate might be visible (or not) in the light that emerges back from the coating. Hiding power is the property of the paint material that inhibits this visibility, manifesting in the opacity of a layer of paint. The term hiding is generic and applied to designate either hiding power or opacity.

If the coating of paint is highly absorptive, the color of the coating will be dark and the hiding will be provided by the absorption. If the coating is highly reflective, the color of the surface will be light in color, but still will hide the substrate well, with the hiding being the result of light scattering. If the paint layer exhibits low absorption and scattering, light will travel through the layer and reveal the substrate (low opacity or poor hiding).

== Measurements ==
The hiding power is measured by applying the coating to the black-and-white (occasionally gray-and-white) panels and using either the photometric or visual observation. Since the eye cannot make the quantitative assessments, yet is very sensitive to the presence of contrast, the measurements are made by varying the paint film thickness, determined by the amount of area that is coated by a certain amount of paint (so called spreading rate, typically measured in square meters per liter).

For the photometry the black and white substrates are calibrated to have, respectively, 1% and 80% reflectivity. The result, a contrast ratio, is expressed as a ratio of the intensity of light reflected from the darker area to the one from the lighter area (technically, the CIE Y or "luminance" is measured). The same substrates are used for the visual measurements.

The hiding power is numerically defined as a spreading rate at which the contrast between the different areas of substrate becomes impossible to see or measure (complete hiding). In practice, an approximated end-point is used instead, for the photometric contrast ratio it is 98%.

=== Kubelka–Munk method ===
The Kubelka–Munk theory was developed in the 1930s and is still widely used in the 21st century. This simplified version of the radiative transfer theory reduces the paint properties to just two coefficients, one for scattering and one for absorption. Once these coefficients are known, the hiding power can be calculated. The longevity of the method is due to the ease of calculating these constants using the optical reflectometry (measurement of just one application of paint with incomplete hide on a black-and-white drawdown chart for each light wavelength is required). The model uses many assumptions, including the diffuse illumination, no reflections on the film/air and film/substrate interfaces, reasonable thickness of the paint layer.

=== Direct measurements ===
Historically, the measurements were made directly using devices such as the Pfund cryptometer (introduced in 1930, earlier "all-black" model is from 1919) that places wet paint into a wedge-like arrangement of plates over the black-and-white background; the wedge is moved over the boundary until the boundary line becomes invisible.

The direct measurements are still in demand where the real-world constraints of an uneven paint application are present, for example, the painting of buildings inevitably involves unevenness of the paint thickness due to the texture of a brush or a roller. The resulting perceived opacity is sometimes called an applied hiding power. ASTM D5150 standard calls for a use of a special panel with stripes of different shades of gray, each stripe has its own "rating". The paint is applied across the stripes, the largest rating of the completely hidden stripes is the hiding power for the paint. Paint producers use variations of this method.

=== Standards ===
- ISO 6504-1:2019 "Paints and varnishes — Determination of hiding power — Part 1" applies the Kubelka–Munk method to white and light-colored paints.
- ISO 6504-3:2019 "Paints and varnishes — Determination of hiding power — Part 3: Determination of hiding power of paints for masonry, concrete and interior use"
- ASTM D2805-11(2018) "Standard Test Method for Hiding Power of Paints by Reflectometry" (2018)
- DIN EN ISO 18314-2:2018-12 "Analytical Colorimetry - Part 2: Saunderson Correction, Solutions of the Kubelka–Munk Equation, Tinting Strength, Hiding Power" (2018)
- ASTM D5150-92(2017) Standard Test Method for Hiding Power of Architectural Paints Applied by Roller.

== Role of pigments ==
Almost all the hiding power of the paint is due to the pigment (binders are typically clear). In general, the hiding power of a pigment is closely related to scattering of light by its particles while suspended in the binder. The scattering on the interface between two substances is higher when there is a larger difference between their refractive indices. The refractive index of a binder is low, about 1.5, so the hiding power of a pigment usually increases with higher values of its refractive index.

=== White ===
White pigments absorb the light poorly. However, if dispersed in a binder some of them, with low refractive indices (about 1.5), while appearing white in the air (with a refractive index of 1.0), exhibit almost no scattering in the paint and thus no hiding power - these are so called "extenders". The white pigments with higher refractive indices deliver opacity and thus are classified as hiding pigments.

== Sources ==
- Gettens, R. J.; Stout, G. L. (1966). "Hiding Power". Painting Materials: A Short Encyclopedia. Courier Corporation. p. 329. ISBN 978-0-486-14242-5. OCLC 868969354.
- Schaeffer, Leonard (1972). "Hiding Power". In Koleske, Joseph V. (ed.). Paint and Coating Testing Manual: 13th. Edition of the Gardner-Sward Handbook. ASTM International. pp. 481–506. doi:10.1520/MNL12225M. ISBN 0-8031-2060-5.
- Vargas, William E.; Niklasson, Gunnar A. (1 August 1997). "Applicability conditions of the Kubelka–Munk theory" (PDF). Applied Optics. 36 (22): 5580–5586. Bibcode:1997ApOpt..36.5580V. doi:10.1364/ao.36.005580. eISSN 1539-4522. ISSN 0003-6935. PMID 18259384.
- Diebold, Michael; Backer, Steven De; Niedenzu, Philipp M.; Hester, Brett R.; Vanhecke, Frank A. C. (2022). "Measurement of the Optical Properties of Paints and Plastics". Pigments, Extenders, and Particles in Surface Coatings and Plastics. Springer International Publishing. pp. 439–481. doi:10.1007/978-3-030-99083-1_13. ISBN 978-3-030-99082-4.
