= Extender =

Extender may refer to:

- DOS extender, a technology for bypassing the limitations of the DOS operating systems family
- Extender (ink), a transparent material added to printing inks
- KC-10 Extender, an air-to-air tanker aircraft
- Meat extender
- Media extender
- Seafood extender or Surimi
- Tele extender, a secondary lens for SLR cameras
- Quickdraw or extender, a piece of climbing equipment used by rock and ice climbers to allow the climbing rope to run freely through bolt anchors or other protection while leading
- Extender (set theory)
- MG Extender, a pickup truck vehicle built by SAIC Motor and sold in Thailand

== See also ==
- Ascender (typography)
- Descender
