= List of fellows of the Royal Society elected in 1879 =

Fellows of the Royal Society elected in 1879.

== Fellows ==
1. John Anderson (1833–1900)
2. Miles Joseph Berkeley (1803–1889)
3. Henry Bessemer (1813–1898)
4. Alexander Crum Brown (1838–1922)
5. Walter Lawry Buller (1838–1906)
6. Francis Stephen Bennet Francois de Chaumont (1833–1888)
7. Richard Assheton Cross (1823–1914)
8. George Howard Darwin (1845–1912)
9. Joseph David Everett (1831–1904)
10. George Downing Liveing (1827–1924)
11. George Matthey (1825–1913)
12. George John Romanes (1848–1894)
13. Arthur Schuster (1851–1934)
14. Harry Govier Seeley (1839–1909)
15. Benjamin Williamson (1827–1916)
16. Thomas Wright (1809–1884)

== Foreign members ==
1. Arthur Auwers (1838–1915)
2. Jean Louis Armand de Quatrefages de Bréau (1810–1892)
3. Luigi Cremona (1830–1903)
4. Georg Hermann Quincke (1834–1924)
5. Theodor Ambrose Hubert Schwann (1810–1882)
6. Jean-Servais Stas (1813–1891)
