= Cities in Flight =

Series of novels and short stories by James Blish

- Cover of the first omnibus edition, 1970.
- Author: James Blish
- Language: English
- Genre: Science fiction, Adventure fiction
- Publication date: 1955 to 1962
- Publication place: United States
- Media type: Print

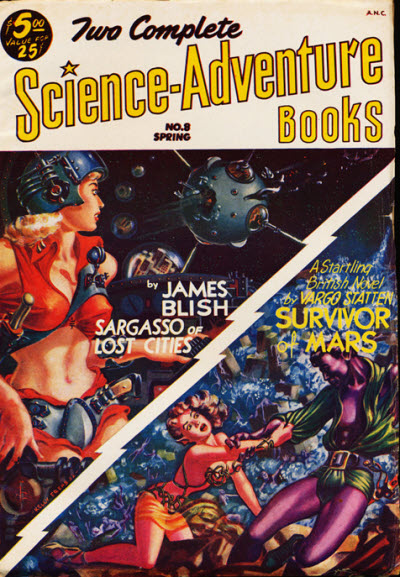
The novella "Sargasso of Lost Cities", Blish's third "Cities in Flight" story, was originally published in Two Complete Science-Adventure Books in 1953.

Cities in Flight is a four-volume series of science fiction novels and short stories by American writer James Blish, originally published between 1950 and 1962, which were first known collectively as the "Okie" novels. The series features entire cities that are able to fly through space using an anti-gravity device, the spindizzy. The stories cover roughly two thousand years, from the very near future to the end of the universe. One story, "Earthman, Come Home", won a Retro Hugo Award in 2004 for Best Novelette. Since 1970, the primary edition has been the omnibus volume first published in paperback by Avon Books. Over the years James Blish made many changes to these stories in response to points raised in letters from readers.

== The books ==
=== They Shall Have Stars ===
They Shall Have Stars (1956) (also published under the title Year 2018!), incorporating the stories "Bridge" and "At Death's End", is set in the then near future (the book begins in 2013). In this future, the Soviet Union still exists and the Cold War is still ongoing. As a result, Western civil liberties have been eroded more and more, until society eventually resembles the Soviet model. Alaska's Senator Bliss Wagoner, head of the Joint Congressional Committee on Space Flight, is determined to do something about it.

Scientific research has stagnated, mainly because knowledge has become restricted. On the advice of scientist Dr. Corsi, Wagoner concentrates his attention on fringe science theories. One project he has funded is the building of a "bridge" made of Ice IV on the surface of Jupiter. This leads to one of two major discoveries which make interstellar space travel feasible: gravity manipulation (nicknamed the "spindizzy"), which leads to both a faster-than-light travel and effective shielding. Another project yields an "anti-agathic" drug, which stops aging. Wagoner is eventually convicted of treason by an oppressive regime, but not before he has sent out expeditions (in a later book, it is revealed that they succeed in establishing thriving colonies). Politically, the book clearly expresses a strong opposition to McCarthyism, at its peak during the time of writing. The main antagonist is Francis X. MacHinery, hereditary Director of the FBI, which has become a de facto secret police agency. In the final chapter he is heard to say "Bliss Wagoner is dead", with the narrative noting that "as usual, he was wrong", as Wagoner's legacy will endure.

Reviewing a later edition, the Hartford Courant described the novel as "a skillful mixture of human reality and technological fantasy".

=== A Life for the Stars ===
In the period in between the first and second parts, the Cold War ended with the peaceful merging of the Eastern and Western blocs into a single, planet-wide Soviet-ruled dictatorship, which hardly made any perceptible change, as the West's political system had already become virtually identical with the Soviet one. However, this dictatorial power was broken by the spindizzy drive which becomes more efficient as more mass is affected, so that dissidents and malcontents have an easy way of escaping and going off into space. First factories, then eventually whole cities migrate from the economically depressed Earth in search of work; these space-wandering cities are called Okies.

A Life for the Stars (1962) is a bildungsroman describing the adventures of sixteen-year-old Chris deFord, born when the above process of migration had already been going on for a considerable time. When Chris goes to watch the imminent departure of Scranton, Pennsylvania, he is seized by a press gang and brought with it.

After several adventures, Chris is fortunate to be transferred to the much more prosperous New York (or at least the Manhattan portion of it), a major "Okie" city under Mayor John Amalfi. Scranton is run by the city manager rather than its figurehead mayor. When the two cities meet again and come into conflict over Scranton's bungling of a job, Chris is able to convince an influential friend in his old city to depose the city manager and end the conflict. Impressed, Amalfi elevates him to the newly created position of city manager of New York and changes his status from passenger to resident (which entitles him to anti-agathic drugs).

=== Earthman, Come Home ===
Earthman, Come Home (1955, G. P. Putnam's Sons, New York), combining the stories "Okie", "Bindlestiff", "Sargasso of Lost Cities" and "Earthman, Come Home", is the longest book in the series. It describes the many adventures of New York under Amalfi, amongst a galaxy which has planets settled, at different periods of history, under loose control by Earth. After an economic collapse causes a galactic depression, New York ends up in a "Jungle", where Okie cities orbit a dying red giant star while waiting for work. Amalfi realises that the "Vegan Orbital Fort", a semi-mythical remnant of the previously dominant alien civilisation, is hiding among the Okies. His plan to stop the Vegans involves forcing the Okies to "march" on Earth, attracting the Vegan fort to join in the "march", and culminates in installing a spindizzy drive system on a small planet and using it to lead the march. When the march reaches Earth, a big fleet of armed Earth police ships appears from invisibility and summarily vaporises the marchers, with at least one loss in the police fleet, because it is recorded that the flying city Buda-Pesht destroyed a police monitor. A mention of the "Battle of the Jungle" may mean that the Earth Police cleanup fleet then goes to the "Jungle" and destroys all that it finds there. Amalfi takes advantage of the vastly higher speed and size of the flying planet to destroy the Vegan Orbital Fort, then flies New York away before the Earth Police can catch them.

Eventually, the city is projected out of the Milky Way galaxy, towards the Greater Magellanic Cloud. With some of New York's spindizzies irreparably damaged, Amalfi convinces the New Yorkers that they must find a planet to call home. On their chosen planet, New York encounters the Interstellar Master Traders (IMT), a rogue city whose brutal sack of the planet Thor 5 damaged the reputation of Okies in general, and who have enslaved the local human population. In typical fashion, Amalfi swindles the IMT residents and sets their spindizzy engineers to fly the city off the planet, where they are destroyed by Earth Police ships.

Although Blish rarely defines how much time passes during each adventure, a late chapter implies that over three hundred years pass in the course of the novel. Reviewer Groff Conklin praised it as "a real, honest, pure, gee-whiz space opera."

=== A Clash of Cymbals/The Triumph of Time ===
A Clash of Cymbals (published in the U.S. as The Triumph of Time) (1959) follows the passage of Amalfi and the planet "He" undertaking the first intergalactic transit. In the less relativistically distorted space between the two galaxies, evidence of a collision between two universes is detected by the "Hevians" — a matter-antimatter collision that reveals the cyclic nature of reality. An alien culture is also investigating this phenomenon, which will shortly accelerate to engulf all galactic space; in other words, the colliding universes will end in a transition from the Big Bang to the Big Crunch. It will be possible to modify the future development of the fresh universes which will emerge from this singularity, and Amalfi directs the "New Earth" residents to compete with the alien culture (the Web of Hercules) in order to prevent their manipulation of the future of the universe.

As with the other books, a detailed description of the technologies used is provided, including cosmological calculus. While there are some continuity slips, the series presents a unified story of humanity's expansion across the galaxy and the birth of a new universe.

Frederik Pohl praised the novel as "science fiction which deals with tomorrow on its own terms", citing Blish's "triumph of inventions, great and small", but concluded that despite the "brilliance" of the author's conceptions, Triumph suffered from its inadequate story.

== Fictional technology ==
- The powerful space weapon called the Bethé blaster operates by causing a fast nuclear fusion explosion in all low-atomic-weight elements in its target, thus completely vaporizing its target. It efficiently and quickly destroys any Okie city which it is fired at. It was named after Hans Bethe.
- The mesotron rifle is a hand-held energy weapon.
- The spindizzy is an anti-gravity and faster-than-light flight device. The drive also produces a "force field" barrier around the city that keeps in its atmosphere and heat. One unusual aspect of the drive is that the larger the mass inside the spindizzy field, the higher velocity it can achieve. In several stories in which planets were equipped with spindizzy drives, the speed of travel is so high only computers can react quickly enough to avoid collisions with stars.
- The Dirac communicator allows instantaneous communication across the width of a galaxy. It was named after Paul Dirac. It occurs often in Blish's fiction and its creation is described in the novel The Quincunx of Time.
- Bethé barrier: a sort of defensive barrier sometimes set up at an Okie city's limits.
- Transistor metals: the story mentions germanium often, including as a money metal, but it never mentions silicon. In the real world, silicon became reliable as a transistor metal in 1957-1958, after most of these books were published.
- In the start of A Life for the Stars a man booking a ride in a computer-controlled taxicab spoke his social security number to it, demonstrating computer voice recognition.

=== Spindizzy ===
The Dillon-Wagoner Graviton Polarity Generator, known colloquially as the spindizzy, is a fictitious anti-gravity device imagined by Blish in Cities in Flight. This device grows more efficient with the amount of mass being lifted, which was used as the hook for the stories—it was more effective to lift an entire city than it was to lift something smaller, such as a classic spaceship. This is taken to extremes in the final stories, where an entire planet is used to cross the galaxy in a matter of hours using the spindizzy drive.

According to the stories, the spindizzy is based on the Blackett effect—principles contained in an equation coined by British physicist P.M.S. Blackett. Several other Blish stories involving novel space drives contain the same assertion. Blackett's original formula was an attempt to correlate the known magnetic fields of large rotating bodies, such as the Sun, Earth, and a star in Cygnus whose field had been measured indirectly. It was unusual in that it attempted to relate the gravitational field and the electromagnetic field, the one governing forces between masses, the other governing forces between electric charges. However, it was never accepted, and was disproved by new discoveries such as magnetic field reversals on Earth and the Sun, and the lack of a magnetic field on bodies such as Mars, despite its rotation being similar to Earth's.

Blish's extrapolation was that if rotation combined with mass produces magnetism via gravity, then rotation and magnetism could produce anti-gravity. The field created by a spindizzy is described as altering the magnetic moment of any atom within its influence.

== Cities ==
In the year 2010 omnibus edition, these flying Okie cities are named (but many more are mentioned):

- Buda-Pesht (Hungary)
- Coquilhatville - Congo
- Dresden - Saxony (Germany)
- Pittsburgh
- New York City - The main protagonist City about which the stories revolve.
- Thorium Trust's Plant Number 8
- Gravitogorsk-Mars (later renamed) IMT = Interstellar Master Traders
- Los Angeles (only in a legend that was current among the Okie cities)
- Liverpool (England)
- Bradley - Vermont
- Lincoln, Nevada (a false name used for itself by the Vegan orbital fort).
- Scranton (Pennsylvania, USA)

And one city which is not described as flying:

- Washington, D.C. - Described as 'The sole City on the sleepy planetary capital of the system', and 'The place where old bureaucrats went to retire', Earth. All other Cities had by this time left the earth. Seat of operations of the Earth Police, and the Earth Government which regulates and polices the far-flung Okie cities.

== References in other works ==
The spindizzy was used in at least two novels by Jesse Franklin Bone, The Lani People and Confederation Matador, and appears as the nickname for fictional Heim Theory devices in Ken MacLeod's The Execution Channel.

Cities in Flight is also a song by Test Shot Starfish.
