= Diffuse reflectance infrared Fourier transform spectroscopy =

FTIR spectroscopy applied on powder samples without prior preparation

Diffuse reflectance infrared Fourier transform spectroscopy (DRIFTS) is an infrared spectroscopy sampling technique used on powder samples without prior preparation. The sample is added to a sample cup and the data is collected on the bulk sample. The infrared light on a sample is reflected and transmitted at different amounts depending on the bulk properties of the material. Diffuse reflection of the incident light produced by the sample's rough surface reflection in all directions is collected by use of an ellipsoid or paraboloid mirror. Shape, compactness, refractive index, reflectivity and absorption of the particles are all characteristic of the material being analyzed. If the sample is too absorbent, then it can be diluted with a nonabsorbent material such as potassium bromide, potassium chloride, etc. The particle size should be smaller than the wavelength of the incident light in order to minimize Mie scattering, so this would infer that it should be less than 5 μm for mid-infrared spectroscopy. The spectra are plotted in units of log inverse reflectance (log 1/R) versus wavenumber. Alternative plots of Kubelka-Munk units can be used, which relate reflectance to concentration using a scaling factor. A reflectance standard is needed in order to quantify the reflectance of the sample because it cannot be determined directly.

== See also ==
- Attenuated total reflectance
- Remission
