= Kubelka–Munk theory =

Modelling the appearance of paint coatings

In optics, the Kubelka–Munk theory devised by Paul Kubelka and Franz Munk, is a fundamental approach to modelling the appearance of paint films, and used for traditional artists transitioning into digital art. As published in 1931, the theory addresses "the question of how the color of a substrate is changed by the application of a coat of paint of specified composition and thickness, and especially the thickness of paint needed to obscure the substrate". The mathematical relationship involves just two paint-dependent constants.

In their article, differential equations are developed using a two-stream approximation for light diffusing through a coating whose absorption and remission (back-scattering) coefficients are known. The total remission from a coating surface is the summation of:

1. the reflectance of the coating surface;
2. the remission from the interior of the coating; and
3. the remission from the surface of the substrate.

The intensity considered in the latter two parts is modified by the absorption of the coating material. The concept is based on the simplified picture of two diffuse light fluxes moving through semi-infinite plane-parallel layers, with one flux proceeding "downward", and the other simultaneously "upward".

While Kubelka entered this field through an interest in coatings, his work has influenced workers in other areas as well. In the original article, there is a special case of interest to many fields is "the albedo of an infinitely thick coating". This case yielded the Kubelka–Munk equation, which describes the remission from a sample composed of an infinite number of infinitesimal layers, each having a_{0} as an absorption fraction and r_{0} as a remission fraction. The authors noted that the remission from an infinite number of these infinitesimal layers is "solely a function of the ratio of the absorption and back-scatter (remission) constants a_{0}/r_{0}, but not in any way on the absolute numerical values of these constants". (The equation is presented in the same mathematical form as in the article, but with symbolism modified. (Note: The original symbolism was: $H_\infty = 1 + \frac {s}{r} - \sqrt{\frac {s^2}{r^2} + 2 \frac {s}{r}}$, where confusingly $s$ is related to absorption, not scatter. The $H$ is for the German word Helligkeit, "brightness".))

$$R_\infty = 1 + \frac {a_0}{r_0} - \sqrt{ \frac{a_0^2}{r_0^2} + 2 \frac{a_0}{r_0} }.$$

While numerous early authors had developed similar two-constant equations, the mathematics of most of these was found to be consistent with the Kubelka–Munk treatment. Others added additional constants to produce more accurate models, but these generally did not find wide acceptance. Due to its simplicity and its acceptable prediction accuracy in many industrial applications, the Kubelka–Munk model remains very popular. However, in almost every application area, the limitations of the model have required improvements. Sometimes these improvements are touted as extensions of Kubelka–Munk theory, sometimes as embracing more general mathematics of which the Kubelka–Munk equation is a special case, and sometimes as an alternate approach.

== Paint colors ==
In the original article, there are several special cases important to paints that are addressed, along with a mathematical definition of hiding power (an ability to hide the surface of an object). The hiding power of a coating measures its ability to obscure a background of contrasting color. Hiding power is also known as opacity or covering power.

In the following, R is the fraction of incident light that is remitted (reflected) by a coated substrate under consideration, R_{g} is the remission fraction from the substrate alone, R_{c} is the remission fraction from the coating, R_{∞} is remission fraction of an infinitely thick layer, $T$ is the fraction of incident light transmitted by the sample under consideration, and X is the coating thickness.

Ideal white paint
An ideal white paint reflects all incident light, and absorbs none, or $a = 0,$ and $R_\infty = 1.$ For this case, the remission fraction R for a layer of finite thickness $X$ is $R = r_0 X / (r_0 X + 1).$
Ideal glaze
A coating of an ideal glaze emits no light ($R_\text{c} = 0$) and absorbs a fraction $a_0 X.$ For this case, $R = R_g \exp(-2a_0 X)$. For an infinitely thick glaze, $R_\infty = 0.$

In the original article, there is a solution for remission from a coating of finite thickness. Kubelka derived many additional formulas for a variety of other cases, which were published in the post-war years. Whereas the 1931 theory assumed that light flows in one dimension (two fluxes, upward and downward within the layer), in 1948 Kubelka derived the same equations (up to a factor of 2) assuming spherical scatter within the paint layer. Later he generalized the theory to inhomogeneous layers (see below).

== Paper and paper coatings ==
The Kubelka–Munk theory is also used in the paper industry to predict optical properties of paper, avoiding a labor-intensive trial-and-error approach. The theory is relatively simple in terms of the number of constants involved, works very well for many papers, and is well documented for use by the pulp and paper industry. If the optical properties (e.g., reflectance and opacity) of each pulp, filler, and dye used in paper-making are known, then the optical properties of a paper made with any combination of the materials can be predicted. If the contrast ratio and reflectivity of a paper are known, the changes in these properties with a change in basis weight can be predicted.

While the Kubelka–Munk coefficients are assumed to be linear and independent quantities, the relationship fails in regions of strong absorption, such as in the case of dyed paper. Several theories were proposed to explain the non-linear behavior of the coefficients, attributing the non-linearity to the non-isotropic structure of paper at both the micro- and macroscopic levels. However, using an analysis based on the Kramers–Kronig relations, the coefficients were shown to be dependent quantities related to the real and imaginary part of the refractive index. By accounting for this dependency, the anomalous behavior of the Kubelka–Munk coefficients in regions of strong absorption were fully explained.

== Semiconductors ==
The band-gap energy of semiconductors is frequently determined from a Tauc plot, where either the quantity ${(F(R_\infty)E)}^2$ (for a direct band-gap) or $\sqrt{F(R_\infty)E}$ (for an indirect band-gap) is plotted against photon energy E. Then the band-gap energy can be obtained by extending the straight segment of the graph to the E axis. There is a simpler method adapted from the Kubelka–Munk theory, in which the band gap is calculated by plotting, $(aE)^2$ versus E, where $a$ is the absorption coefficient.

== Colors ==
Early practitioners, especially D. R. Duncan, assumed that in a mixture of pigments, the colors produced in any given medium may be deduced from formulae involving two constants for each pigment. These constants, which vary with the wavelength of the incident light, measure respectively the absorbing power of the pigment for light and its scattering power. The work of Kubelka and Munk was seen as yielding a useful systematic approach to color mixing and matching. By resolving the Kubelka–Munk equation for the ratio of absorption to scatter, one can obtain a "remission function":
$$F(R_\infty) \equiv \frac{(1 - R_\infty)^2}{2R_\infty} = \frac{a_0}{r_0}.$$

We may define $K$ and $S$ as absorption and back-scattering coefficients, which replace the absorption and remission fractions a_{0} and r_{0} in the Kubelka–Munk equation above. Then assuming separate additivity of the absorption and coefficients for each of $i$ components of concentration $c_i$:
$$\frac{(1 - R_\infty)^2}{2R_\infty} = \frac{a_0}{r_0} = \frac{K}{S} = \frac{\Sigma(c_i K_i)}{\Sigma(c_i S_i)} \approx \frac{\Sigma(c_i K_i)}{S}.$$

For the case of small amount of pigments, the scatter $S$ is dominated by the base material and is assumed to be constant. In such a case, the equation is linear in concentration of pigment.

== Spectroscopy ==
One special case has received much attention in diffuse reflectance spectroscopy: that of an opaque (infinitely thick) coating, which can be applied to a sample modeled as an infinite number of infinitesimal layers. The two-stream approximation was embraced by the early practitioners. There were far more mathematics to choose from, but the name Kubelka–Munk became widely regarded as synonymous with any technique that modeled diffuse radiation moving through layers of infinitesimal size. This was aided by the popular assumption that the Kubelka–Munk function (above) was analogous to the absorbance function in transmission spectroscopy.

In the field of infrared spectroscopy, it was common to prepare solid samples by finely grinding the sample with potassium bromide (KBr). This led to a situation analogous to the described in the section just above for pigments, where the analyte had little effect on the scatter, which was dominated by the KBr. In this case, the assumption of the function being linear with concentration was reasonable.

However, in the field of near-infrared spectroscopy, the samples are generally measured in their natural (often particulate) state, and deviations from linearity at higher absorption levels were routinely observed. The remission function (also called the Kubelka–Munk function) was almost abandoned in favor of "log(1/R)". A more general equation, called the Dahm equation, was developed, along with a scheme to separate the effects of scatter from absorption in the log(1/R) data. In the equation, $R_n$ and $T_n$ are the measured remission by and transmission through a sample of $n$ layers, each layer having absorption and remission fractions of $a$ and R. Note that the so-called ART function

$$A(R, T) \equiv \frac{(1 - R_n)^2 - T_n^2}{R_n} = \frac{(2 - a - 2r)a}{r}$$

is constant for any sample thickness.

In other areas of spectroscopy, there are shifts away from the strict use of the Kubelka–Munk treatment as well.

== Failure of continuous models of diffuse reflectance ==
Continuous models are widely used to model diffuse reflection from particulate samples. They are embodied in various theories, including diffusion theory, the equation of radiation transfer, as well as Kubelka–Munk. In spite of its widespread use, there has long been an understanding that the Kubelka–Munk (K–M) theory has limitations. The term "failure of the Kubelka–Munk theory" has been applied because it does not "remain valid in strongly absorbing materials". There have been many attempts to explain the limitations and amend the K–M equation. In literature related to diffuse-reflection infrared Fourier-transform (DRIFT) spectra, "particularly specular reflection" is often identified as a culprit. In some corners, there is the working assumption that the problem is that the K–M theory is a two-flux theory, and that introducing additional directions will solve the problem. In particular, two continuous theories, "diffusion theory" and the "equation of radiation transfer" (ERT), have their advocates. Some of the advocates of the ERT have called to our attention the failure of the ERT to predict the desired linear absorption coefficient as particle size gets large, and blamed it on the hidden mass effect. In 2003, Donald and Kevin Dahm illustrated the degree to which the continuous theories all suffer from the fundamental limitation of trying to model a discontinuous sample as a continuum and suggested that as long as the effect of this limitation is unexplored, there is little reason to search for other reasons for "failure".

Spectroscopists have a desire to determine the same absorption coefficient quantity from diffuse reflectance measurements as they would from a transmission measurement on a non-scattering sample of the same material. The Bouguer–Lambert law describes the attenuation of transmitted light as exponential falloff in intensity of a direct beam of light as it passes through a medium. The cause of the attenuation may be absorption or scatter. A coefficient unaffected by scatter is desired by absorption spectroscopists. Mathematically, the Bouguer–Lambert law may be expressed as
$$\Tau(direct) = \exp(-kd) \exp(-sd) = \exp[-(k + s)d)] = \exp(-\epsilon d),$$
where $k$ is the linear absorption coefficient, $s$ is the back-scatter coefficient, and $\epsilon$ is their sum, often called the extinction coefficient. (The symbols $\mu_a$ and $\mu_s$ may be used to represent the absorption and scattering parts of the extinction coefficients.)

Through work with the Dahm equation, we know that the ART function is constant for all sample thicknesses of the same material. This would include the infinitesimal layer used in the Kubelka–Munk differentiation. Consequently we may equate numerous functions:
$$2F(R) = A(R,T) = \frac{(2 - a - 2r)a}{r} \approx 2\frac{a_0}{r_0} = 2\frac{a_0/dx}{r_0/dx} = 2\frac{K}{S}.$$

Using a simple system (albeit rather complex mathematics), it can be shown that continuous models correctly predict the R and $T$ in the ART function, but do not correctly predict the fractions of incident light that are transmitted directly. From this, it can be deduced that the coefficients $K$ and $S$ and not proportional to the $k$ and $s$ in the Bouguer–Lambert law.

== Treatment of inhomogeneous layers ==
A coating layer is not the same as the substrate it covers. As Kubelka was interested in coatings, he was of course very interested in the handling of what he called "inhomogeneous layers". A set of equations, one of which was believed to apply to the case, had been published by Frank Benford in 1946 for the case of two light streams through plane parallel layers. However, it did not handle it successfully. Kubelka solved the problem, and we illustrate the solution here. First, a case to which the equation of Benford may be straightforwardly applied.

The sketch shows two surfaces bounding a slab of a non-absorbing medium. Notice that the assembly would appear identical regardless of which side was being entered. Apart from the surfaces, the medium has no spectroscopic properties. A beam of light of unit intensity reaches the front surface, and by our assumptions, half is remitted and half is transmitted. The portion that is transmitted proceeds to the other surface undiminished. There it is again split where half (1/4 of the original incident intensity) is transmitted and half is remitted. The amounts that remitted from the first surface can be totaled as can the amount that are transmitted through the second. The total remission is 2/3 ≈ 0.667. The total transmission is 1/3 ≈ 0.333.

Alternatively, we can use the equation of Benford that applies. For two plane parallel layers, x and y, having different properties, the transmission $T_{xy},$ remission $R_{xy}$, and absorption fractions $A_{xy}$ for the two layers can be calculated from the properties of the individual layers ($T_x, R_x, T_y, R_y$) from the following equations:

$$\begin{aligned}
T_{xy} &= \frac{T_x T_y}{1 - R_{(-x)} R_y} = \frac {(1/2)(1/2)}{1 - (1/2)(1/2)} = \frac{1/4}{3/4} = 1/3, \\
R_{xy} &= R_x + \frac{T_x^2 R_y}{1 - R_{(-x)} R_y} = 1/2 + \frac{(1/2)(1/2)(1/2)}{1 - (1/2)(1/2)} = 2/3, \\
A_{xy} &= 1 - T_{xy} - R_{xy} = 1 - 1/2 - 1/2 = 0.
\end{aligned}$$

Next we will examine the case where the medium is absorbing one. While the total assembly would behave the same in either direction, in order to apply the mathematics, we will need to use an intermediate step where it does not.

Here we will assume that again the surfaces will remit and transmit 1/2 the amount striking it, this time we will assume that half of the intensity will be absorbed a trip across the slab. A beam of light of unit intensity reaches the front surface, and by our assumptions, half is remitted and half is transmitted, but this time half of the transmitted light, or 1/4 is absorbed before another 1/4 reaches the second surface, and 1/4 is remitted back across the slab to face half of it being absorbed. The sketch shows that the calculated values from the equations should be R = 8/15 ≈ 0.533, T = 2/15 ≈ 0.133, A = 1/3 ≈ 0.333.

Now the sketch has three layers, labeled 1, 2, and 3. Layers 1 and 3 remit and transmit 1/2 and absorb nothing. Layer 2 absorbs half and transmits half, but remits nothing. We can build the assembly by first combining layers 1 and 2, and then combining that result as the x value in combing with layer 3 (as y).

So for step 1:
$$R_x = 1/2, T_x = 1/2, R_y = 0, T_y = 1/2,$$
$$\begin{aligned}
T_{xy} &= \frac{T_x T_y}{1 - R_{(-x)} R_y} = \frac{(1/2)(1/2)}{1 - (1/2)(0)} = 1/4, \\
R_{xy} &= R_x + \frac{T_x^2 R_y}{1 - R_{(-x)} R_y} = 1/2 + \frac{(1/2)(1/2)0}{1 - (1/2)0} = 1/2, \\
A_{xy} &= 1 - T_{xy} - R_{xy} = 1 - 1/4 - 1/2 = 1/4.
\end{aligned}$$

Kubelka has shown by theory and experiment that remittance and absorption of a non-homogeneous specimen depend on the direction of illumination, whereas transmittance does not. Consequently, for non-homogeneous layers, the remission $R_{(-x)}$ from the first layer that occurs in the denominator is the remission when illuminated from the reverse (not the forward) direction, so we will need to know the value for $R_{21}$ for the next step, that is when the layer x is layer 2, and layer y is layer 1:
$$R_{yx} = R_y + \frac{T_y^2 R_x}{1 - R_{(-y)} R_x} = 0.0 + \frac{(1/2)(1/2)(1/2)}{1 - 0(1/2)} = 1/8.$$

The next step is then to set $R_x = 1/2$ and $T_x = 1/4$, with $R_y = 1/2$ and $T_y = 1/2$, with $R_{(-x)}$ in the denominator as $1/8$:
$$\begin{aligned}
T_{xy} &= \frac{T_x T_y}{1 - R_x R_y } = \frac{(1/2)(1/4)}{1 - (1/8)(1/2)} = 2/15, \\
R_{xy} &= R_x + \frac {T_x^2 R_y}{1 - R_{(-x)} R_y} = 1/2 + \frac{(1/4)(1/4)(1/2)}{1 - (1/8)(1/2)} = 8/15, \\
A_{xy} &= 1 - T_{xy} - R_{xy} = 1 - 2/15 - 8/15 = 1/3.
\end{aligned}$$

== In computer art ==
The K–M paint-mixing algorithm has been adapted to directly use the RGB color model by Sochorová and Jamriška in 2021. Their "Mixbox" approach works by converting the inputs into a version of CMYK (phthalo blue, quinacridone magenta, Hansa yellow, and titanium white) plus a residue (to account for the gamut difference), performing the K–M mixing in that latent space, and then producing the output in RGB. There are additional concerns for dealing with wider gamuts and improving speed. This RGB adaptation makes it easier for digital painting software to integrate the more realistic K–M method.
