= Drawdown chart =

Paper used to test coating properties

Drawdown charts are rectangular pieces of non-fluorescent paper which are used to test a variety of coating properties. These properties include opacity, spreading rate, penetration, and flow & leveling behavior. This non-fluorescent material has to be especially rugged in order to maintain its structure and give reliable readings, as the coatings tested are often corrosive or abrasive. These charts are necessary in the testing of any coating as they give reliable and accurate readings for any type of coating before the coating is applied to the intended material.

== Drawdown bars ==
Drawdown bars are used in collaboration with drawdown charts. The bars are generally made of stainless steel or aluminum and touch the chart at each end, while the center is slightly raised to a desired height in order to obtain the desired film thickness. As with the charts, the bars have to be especially resistant to corrosion because of the corrosive nature of some coatings. There are a multiplicity of more complicated designs including some in which the paint is already in the chart apparatus, but the bar method described above is the most commonly used.

== Procedure ==
Initially the desired coating is applied in a puddle on the drawdown chart. Then the bar is placed at the top of the chart, and drawn down over the paint in order to spread it evenly along the length of the chart. Once this evenly spread paint dries, it can be tested for a variety of properties.
