= Representative layer theory =

The concept of the representative layer came about though the work of Donald Dahm, with the assistance of Kevin Dahm and Karl Norris, to describe spectroscopic properties of particulate samples, especially as applied to near-infrared spectroscopy. A representative layer has the same void fraction as the sample it represents and each particle type in the sample has the same volume fraction and surface area fraction as does the sample as a whole. The spectroscopic properties of a representative layer can be derived from the spectroscopic properties of particles, which may be determined by a wide variety of ways. While a representative layer could be used in any theory that relies on the mathematics of plane parallel layers, there is a set of definitions and mathematics, some old and some new, which have become part of representative layer theory.

Representative layer theory can be used to determine the spectroscopic properties of an assembly of particles from those of the individual particles in the assembly. The sample is modeled as a series of layers, each of which is parallel to each other and perpendicular to the incident beam. The mathematics of plane parallel layers is then used to extract the desired properties from the data, most notably that of the linear absorption coefficient which behaves in the manner of the coefficient in Beer’s law. The representative layer theory gives a way of performing the calculations for new sample properties by changing the properties of a single layer of the particles, which doesn’t require reworking the mathematics for a sample as a whole.

== History ==
The first attempt to account for transmission and reflection of a layered material was carried out by George G. Stokes in about 1860 and led to some very useful relationships. John W. Strutt (Lord Rayleigh) and Gustav Mie developed the theory of single scatter to a high degree, but Arthur Schuster was the first to consider multiple scatter. He was concerned with the cloudy atmospheres of stars, and developed a plane-parallel layer model in which the radiation field was divided into forward and backward components. This same model was used much later by Paul Kubelka and Franz Munk, whose names are usually attached to it by spectroscopists.

Following WWII, the field of reflectance spectroscopy was heavily researched, both theoretically and experimentally. The remission function, $F(R_\infty)$, following Kubelka-Munk theory, was the leading contender as the metric of absorption analogous to the absorbance function in transmission absorption spectroscopy.

The form of the K-M solution originally was: $F(R_\infty)\equiv \frac{(1-R_\infty)^2}{2R_\infty} = \frac {a_0}{r_0}$, but it was rewritten in terms of linear coefficients by some authors, becoming $F(R_\infty)\equiv\frac{(1-R_\infty)^2}{2R_\infty} = \frac {k}{s}$ , taking $k$ and $s$ as being equivalent to the linear absorption and scattering coefficients as they appear in the Bouguer-Lambert law, even though sources who derived the equations preferred the symbolism $\frac {K}S$ and usually emphasized that $K=2k$ and $S$ was a remission or back-scattering parameter, which for the case of diffuse scatter should properly be taken as an integral.

In 1966, in a book entitled Reflectance Spectroscopy, Harry Hecht had pointed out that the formulation $F(R_\infty) = \frac {k}{s}$ led to $\log F(R_\infty ) = \log k - \log s$, which enabled plotting $F(R_\infty)$ "against the wavelength or wave-number for a particular sample" giving a curve corresponding "to the real absorption determined by transmission measurements, except for a displacement by $-\log s$ in the ordinate direction." However, in data presented, "the marked deviation in the remission function ... in the region of large extinction is obvious." He listed various reasons given by other authors for this "failure ... to remain valid in strongly absorbing materials", including: "incomplete diffusion in the scattering process"; failure to use "diffuse illumination; "increased proportion of regular reflection"; but concluded that "notwithstanding the above mentioned difficulties, ... the remission function should be a linear function of the concentration at a given wavelength for a constant particle size" though stating that "this discussion has been restricted entirely to the reflectance of homogeneous powder layers" though "equation systems for combination of inhomogeneous layers cannot be solved for the scattering and absorbing properties even in the simple case of a dual combination of sublayers. ... This means that the (Kubelka-Munk) theory fails to include, in an explicit manner, any dependence of reflection on particle size or shape or refractive index".

The field of Near infrared spectroscopy (NIR) got its start in 1968, when Karl Norris and co-workers with the Instrumentation Research Lab of the U.S. Department of Agriculture first applied the technology to agricultural products. The USDA discovered how to use NIR empirically, based on available sources, gratings, and detector materials. Even the wavelength range of NIR was empirically set based on the operational range of a PbS detector. Consequently, it was not seen as a rigorous science: it had not evolved in the usual way, from research institutions to general usage. Even though the Kubelka-Munk theory provided a remission function that could have been used as the absorption metric, Norris selected $\log(1/R_\infty)$ for convenience. He believed that the problem of non-linearity between the metric and concentration was due to particle size (a theoretical concern) and stray light (an instrumental effect). In qualitative terms, he would explain differences in spectra of different particle size as changes in the effective path length that the light traveled though the sample.

In 1976, Hecht published an exhaustive evaluation of the various theories which were considered to be fairly general. In it, he presented his derivation of the Hecht finite difference formula by replacing the fundamental differential equations of the Kubelka-Munk theory by the finite difference equations, and obtained: $F(R_\infty) = a\biggl( \frac {1}{r} - 1\biggr) - \frac {a^2}{2r}$ . He noted "it is well known that a plot of $F(R_\infty)$ versus $K$ deviates from linearity for high values of $K$, and it appears that (this equation) can be used to explain the deviations in part", and "represents an improvement in the range of validity and shows the need to consider the particulate nature of scattering media in developing a more precise theory by which absolute absorptivities can be determined."

In 1982, Gerry Birth convened a meeting of experts in several areas that impacted NIR Spectroscopy, with emphasis on diffuse reflectance spectroscopy, no matter which portion of the electromagnetic spectrum might be used. This was the beginning of the International Diffuse Reflectance Conference. At this meeting was Harry Hecht, who may have at the time been the world's most knowledgeable person in the theory of diffuse reflectance. Gerry himself took many photographs illustrating various aspects of diffuse reflectance, many of which were not explainable with the best available theories. In 1987, Birth and Hecht wrote a joint article in a new handbook, which pointed a direction for future theoretical work.

In 1994, Donald and Kevin Dahm began using numerical techniques to calculate remission and transmission from samples of varying numbers of plane parallel layers from absorption and remission fractions for a single layer. Using this entirely independent approach, they found a function that was the independent of the number of layers of the sample. This function, called the Absorption/Remission function and nick-named the ART function, is defined as: $A(R,T) \equiv \frac {(1-R_n)^2-T_n^2}{R_n} = \frac {(2-a-2r)a}{r} = \frac {a(1+t-r)}{r} = 2 F(R_\infty) = \frac {2a_0}{r_0}$ . Besides the relationships displayed here, the formulas obtained for the general case are entirely consistent with the Stokes formulas, the equations of Benford, and Hecht's finite difference formula. For the special cases of infinitesimal or infinitely dilute particles, it gives results consistent with the Schuster equation for isotropic scattering and Kubelka–Munk equation. These equations are all for plane parallel layers using two light streams. This cumulative mathematics was tested on data collected using directed radiation on plastic sheets, a system that precisely matches the physical model of a series of plane parallel layers, and found to conform. The mathematics provided: 1) a method to use plane parallel mathematics to separate absorption and remission coefficients for a sample; 2) an Absorption/Remission function that is constant for all sample thickness; and 3) equations relating the absorption and remission of one thickness of sample to that of any other thickness.

== Mathematics of plane parallel layers in absorption spectroscopy ==
Using simplifying assumptions, the spectroscopic parameters (absorption, remission, and transmission fractions) of a plane parallel layer can be built from the refractive index of the material making up the layer, the linear absorption coefficient (absorbing power) of the material, and the thickness of the layer. While other assumptions could be made, those most often used are those of normal incidence of a directed beam of light, with internal and external reflection from the surface being the same.

=== Determining the A, R, T fractions for a surface ===
For the special case where the incident radiation is normal (perpendicular) to a surface and the absorption is negligible, the intensity of the reflected and transmitted beams can be calculated from the refractive indices η_{1} and η_{2} of the two media, where r is the fraction of the incident light reflected, and t is the fraction of the transmitted light:

$r = \frac {(\eta_2-\eta_1)^2}{(\eta_2+\eta_1)^2}$ , $t= \frac {4 \eta_1\eta_2}{(\eta_2+\eta_1)^2}$ , with the fraction absorbed taken as zero ( $a$ = 0 ).

==== Illustration ====
For a beam of light traveling in air with an approximate index of refraction of 1.0, and encountering the surface of a material having an index of refraction of 1.5:

$r = \frac {(\eta_2-\eta_1)^2}{(\eta_2+\eta_1)^2} = \frac {0.5^2}{2.5^2}= 0.04$ , $t= \frac {4 \eta_1\eta_2}{(\eta_2+\eta_1)^2} = \frac {(4)(1)(1.5)}{2.5^2} = 0.96$

=== Determining the A, R, T fractions for a sheet ===
There is a simplified special case for the spectroscopic parameters of a sheet. This sheet consists of three plane parallel layers (1:front surface, 2:interior, 3:rear surface) in which the surfaces both have the same remission fraction when illuminated from either direction, regardless of the relative refractive indices of the two media on either side of the surface. For the case of zero absorption in the interior, the total remission and transmission from the layer can be determined from the infinite series, where $r_0$ is the remission from the surface:

$A = 0,\qquad$ $R = r_0 + (1-r_0)^2 \sum_{n=1}^\infty r_0^{ (2n-1)},\qquad$ $T = (1-r_0)^2 \sum_{n=0}^\infty r_0^{ 2n}.$

These formulas can be modified to account for absorption. Alternatively, the spectroscopic parameters of a sheet (or slab) can be built up from the spectroscopic parameters of the individual pieces that compose the layer: surface, interior, surface. This can be done using an approach developed by Kubelka for treatment of inhomogeneous layers. Using the example from the previous section: { A_{1} = 0, R_{1} = 0.04, T_{1} = 0.96 } {A_{3} = 0, R_{3} = 0.04, T_{3} = 0.96 }.

We will assume the interior of the sheet is composed of a material that has Napierian absorption coefficient k of 0.5 cm^{−1}, and the sheet is 1 mm thick (d = 1 mm). For this case, on a single trip through the interior, according to the Bouguer-Lambert law, $T=\exp(-kd)$, which according to our assumptions yields $T = \exp (- 0.5\ \text{cm}^{-1}\cdot 0.1\ \text{cm}) =0.95$ and $A = 0.05$. Thus { A_{2} = 0.05, R_{2} = 0, T_{2} = 0.95 }.

Then one of Benford's equations can be applied. If A_{x}, R_{x} and T_{x} are known for layer x and A_{y} R_{y} and T_{y} are known for layer y, the ART fractions for a sample composed of layer x and layer y are:

$T_{x+y} = \frac {T_x T_y}{1-R_{(-x)} R_y},\qquad$ $R_{x+y} = R_x + \frac {T_x^2 R_y}{1-R_{(-x)} R_y},\qquad$ $A_{x+y} = 1 - T_{x+y} - R_{x+y}$
(The symbol $R_{(-x)}$ means the reflectance of layer $x$ when the direction of illumination is antiparallel to that of the incident beam. The difference in direction is important when dealing with inhomogeneous layers. This consideration was added by Paul Kubelka in 1954. He also pointed out that transmission was independent of the direction of illumination, but absorption and remission were not.)

==== Illustration ====
Step 1: We take layer 1 as x, and layer 2 as y. By our assumptions in this case, { $R_1=R_{(-1)} = 0.04 , R_2=0 , T_1=0.96 , T_2=0.95$ }.$T_{x+y} = \frac {T_x T_y}{1-R_{(-x)} R_y}= \frac {(0.96)(0.95)}{1-(0.04) 0} = 0.912 \quad$ $R_{x+y} = R_x + \frac {T_x^2 R_y}{1-R_{(-x)} R_y} = 0.04 + \frac {(0.96^2)0}{1-(0.04)0} = 0.04 \quad$ $R_{y+x} = R_y + \frac {T_y^2 R_x}{1-R_{(-y)} R_x} = 0+\frac {(0.95^2)(0.04)}{1-0(0.04)} = 0.0361$

Step 2: We take the result from step 1 as the value for new x [ x is old x+y; (-x) is old y+x ], and the value for layer 3 as new y.

$T_{x+y} = \frac {T_x T_y}{1-R_{(-x)} R_y} = \frac {(0.912)(0.96)}{1-(0.0361)(0.04)} =0.877 = T_{123}$ $R_{x+y} = R_x + \frac {T_x^2 R_y}{1-R_{(-x)} R_y} = 0.04 + \frac {(0.912^2)(0.04)}{1-(0.0361)(0.04)} = .0733 =R_{123}$

$A_{123} = 1-R_{123}-T_{123} = 1 - 0.877 - .073 = 0.05$

Dahm has shown that for this special case, the total amount of light absorbed by the interior of the sheet (considering surface remission) is the same as that absorbed in a single trip (independent of surface remission). This is borne out by the calculations.

The decadic absorbance ($\mathsf{\Alpha b}_{10}$) of the sheet is given by: $\mathsf{\Alpha b}_{10} = -log(1-A_{123}) = 0.0222$

=== Determining the A, R, T fractions for n layers ===
The Stokes Formulas can be used to calculate the ART fractions for any number of layers. Alternatively, they can be calculated by successive application of Benford's equation for "one more layer".

If A_{1}, R_{1}, and T_{1} are known for the representative layer of a sample, and A_{n}, R_{n} and T_{n} are known for a layer composed of n representative layers, the ART fractions for a layer with thickness of n + 1 are:

$T_{n+1} = \frac {T_n T_1}{1-R_n R_1},\qquad$ $R_{n+1} = R_n + \frac {T_n^2 R_1}{1-R_n R_1},\qquad$ $A_{n+1} = 1 - T_{n+1} - R_{n+1}$

==== Illustration ====
In the above example, { $A_1 = 0.05, R_1=0.0733 , T_1 =0.877$ }. The Table shows the results of repeated application of the above formulas.

n	A	R	T
1	0.050	0.073	0.877
2	0.097	0.130	0.773
3	0.141	0.174	0.685
4	0.183	0.209	0.608
5	0.222	0.236	0.542
6	0.258	0.258	0.483
7	0.292	0.276	0.432
8	0.324	0.290	0.387
9	0.353	0.301	0.347
10	0.379	0.310	0.311
11	0.404	0.317	0.279
12	0.427	0.323	0.250
13	0.447	0.328	0.225
14	0.466	0.331	0.202
15	0.484	0.334	0.182
16	0.500	0.337	0.163

=== Absorbing Power: The Scatter Corrected Absorbance of a sample ===
Within a homogeneous media such as a solution, there is no scatter. For this case, the function is linear with both the concentration of the absorbing species and the path-length. Additionally, the contributions of individual absorbing species are additive. For samples which scatter light, absorbance is defined as "the negative logarithm of one minus absorptance (absorption fraction: $\alpha$) as measured on a uniform sample". For decadic absorbance, this may be symbolized as: $\Alpha_{10}=-log_{10}(1-\alpha)$ . Even though this absorbance function is useful with scattering samples, the function does not have the same desirable characteristics as it does for non-scattering samples. There is, however, a property called absorbing power which may be estimated for these samples. The absorbing power of a single unit thickness of material making up a scattering sample is the same as the absorbance of the same thickness of the materiel in the absence of scatter.

==== Illustration ====
Suppose that we have a sample consisting of 14 sheets described above, each one of which has an absorbance of 0.0222. If we are able to estimate the absorbing power (the absorbance of a sample of the same thickness, but having no scatter) from the sample without knowing how many sheets are in the sample (as would be the general case), it would have the desirable property of being proportional to the thickness. In this case, we know that the absorbing power (scatter corrected absorbance) should be: {14 x the absorbance of a single sheet} $= (14)(0.0222) = 0.312$ . This is the value we should have for the sample if the absorbance is to follow the law of Bouguer (often referred to as Beer's law).

In the Table below, we see that the sample has the A,R,T values for the case of 14 sheets in the Table above. Because of the presence of scatter, the measured absorbance of the sample would be: $\mathsf{\Alpha b}_{10} = -log(1-A_S) = -log(0.466) = 0.2728$. Then we calculate this for the half sample thickness using another of Benford's equations. If A_{d}, R_{d} and T_{d} are known for a layer with thickness d, the ART fractions for a layer with thickness of d/2 are:

$R_{d/2} = \frac {R_d}{1+T_d},\qquad$ $T_{d/2} = \sqrt{T_d (1-R_{d/2}^2)},\qquad$ $A_{d/2} = 1 - T_{d/2} - R_{d/2},$

In the line for half sample [S/2], we see the values which are the same as those for 7 layers in the Table above, as we expect. Note that $-log(1-A_{S/2}) = -log(1-0.292) = 0.150$. We desire to have the absorbance be linear with sample thickness, but we find when we multiply this value by 2, we get $(2)(0.150) = 0.300$ , which is a significant departure from the previous estimate for the absorbing power.

The next iteration of the formula produces the estimate for A,R,T for a quarter sample: $-log(1-0.162) \times 4 =0.307$. Note that this time the calculation corresponds to three and a half layers, a thickness of sample that cannot exist physically.

Continuing for the sequentially higher powers of two, we see a monotonically increasing estimate. Eventually the numbers will start jumping with round off error, but one can stop when getting a constant value to a specified number of significant figures. In this case, we become constant to 4 significant figures at 0.3105, which is our estimate for the absorbing power of the sample. This corresponds to our target value of 0.312 determined above.

	A	R	T	Absorbing Power Estimate
S	0.466	0.331	0.202	0.273
S/2	0.292	0.276	0.432	0.300
S/4	0.162	0.192	0.645	0.307
S/8	0.085	0.117	0.798	0.3099
S/16	0.044	0.0651	0.891	0.3104
S/32	0.022	0.0344	0.943	0.3105
S/64	0.011	0.0177	0.971	0.3105

== Expressing particulate mixtures as layers ==
If one wants to use a theory based on plane parallel layers, optimally the samples would be describable as layers. But a particulate sample often looks a jumbled maze of particles of various sizes and shapes, showing no structured pattern of any kind, and certainly not literally divided into distinct, identical layers. Even so, it is a tenet of Representative Layer Theory that for spectroscopic purposes, we may treat the complex sample as if it were a series of layers, each one representative of the sample as a whole.

=== Definition of a representative layer ===
To be representative, the layer must meet the following criteria:

• The volume fraction of each type of particle is the same in the representative layer as in the sample as a whole.

• The surface area fraction of each type of particle is the same in the representative layer as in the sample as a whole.

• The void fraction of the representative layer is the same as in the sample.

• The representative layer is nowhere more than one particle thick. Note this means the “thickness” of the representative layer is not uniform. This criterion is imposed so that we can assume that a given photon of light has only one interaction with the layer. It might be transmitted, remitted, or absorbed as a result of this interaction, but it is assumed not to interact with a second particle within the same layer.

In the above discussion, when we talk about a “type” of particle, we must clearly distinguish between particles of different composition. In addition, however, we must distinguish between particles of different sizes. Recall that scattering is envisioned as a surface phenomenon and absorption is envisioned as occurring at the molecular level throughout the particle. Consequently, our expectation is that the contribution of a “type” of particle to absorption will be proportional to the volume fraction of that particle in the sample, and the contribution of a “type” of particle to scattering will be proportional to the surface area fraction of that particle in the sample. This is why our “representative layer” criteria above incorporate both volume fraction and surface area fraction. Since small particles have larger surface area-to-volume ratios than large particles, it is necessary to distinguish between them.

=== Determining spectroscopic properties of a representative layer ===
Under these criteria, we can propose a model for the fractions of incident light that are absorbed ($A_1$), remitted ($R_1$), and transmitted ($T_1$) by one representative layer.

$A_1= \sum S_j (1-exp(-k_jd_j))$ , $R_1=\sum S_jb_jd_j$ , $T_1 = 1-R_1-T_1$

in which:

• $S_j$ is the fraction of cross-sectional surface area that is occupied by particles of type $j$.

• $K_j$ is the effective absorption coefficient for particles of type $j$.

• $b_j$ is the remission coefficient for particles of type $j$.

• $d_j$ is the thickness of a particle of type $j$ in the direction of the incident beam.

• The summation is carried out over all of the distinct “types” of particle.

In effect, $S_j$represents the fraction of light that will interact with a particle of type $j$, and $K_j$and $b_j$ quantify the likelihood of that interaction resulting in absorption and remission, respectively.

Surface area fractions and volume fractions for each type of particle can be defined as follows:

$v_i= \frac { \frac {w_i}{\rho_i}} {\sum \frac {w_j}{\rho_j}}$ , $s_i= \frac { \frac {w_i}{\rho_i d_i}} {\sum \frac {w_j}{\rho_jd_j}}$ , $V_i = (1-v_0)v_i$ , $S_i = (1-v_0)s_i$

in which:

• $w_i$ is the mass fraction of particles of type i in the sample.

• $v_i$ is the fraction of occupied volume composed of particles of type i.

• $s_i$ is the fraction of particle surface area that is composed of particles of type i.

• $V_i$ is the fraction of total volume composed of particles of type i.

• $S_i$ is the fraction of cross-sectional surface area that is composed of particles of type i.

• $\rho _i$ is the density of particles of type i.

• $v_0$ is the void fraction of the sample.

This is a logical way of relating the spectroscopic behavior of a “representative layer” to the properties of the individual particles that make up the layer. The values of the absorption and remission coefficients represent a challenge in this modeling approach. Absorption is calculated from the fraction of light striking each type of particle and a “Beer’s law”-type calculation of the absorption by each type of particle, so the values of $K_i$used should ideally model the ability of the particle to absorb light, independent of other processes (scattering, remission) that also occur. We referred to this as the absorbing power in the section above.

== List of principle symbols used ==
Where a given letter is used in both capital and lower case form (r, R and t, T ) the capital letter refers to the macroscopic observable and the lower case letter to the corresponding variable for an individual particle or layer of the material. Greek symbols are used for properties of a single particle.

- $a$ – absorption fraction of a single layer
- $r$ – remission fraction of a single layer
- $t$ – transmission fraction of a single layer
- A_{n}, R_{n}, T_{n} – The absorption, remission, and transmission fractions for a sample composed of n layers
- α – absorption fraction of a particle
- β – back-scattering from a particle
- σ – isotropic scattering from a particle
- $k$– absorption coefficient defined as the fraction of incident light absorbed by a very thin layer divided by the thickness of that layer
- $s$ – scattering coefficient defined as the fraction of incident light scattered by a very thin layer divided by the thickness of that layer
