= Gustav Kortüm =

German chemist

Gustav Ferdinand Albert Kortüm (14 June 1904 to 1 December 1990) was a German physical chemist and electrochemist.

Kortüm was the son of a pastor and studied chemistry at Karlsruhe Institute of Technology from 1922. In 1928 he received his doctorate under Georg Bredig with a thesis on the synthesis of hydrocyanic acid from carbon monoxide and ammonia. He then worked as a postdoctoral researcher at the Kaiser-Wilhelm-Institut für Physical Chemistry and Electrochemistry in Berlin and from 1929 was assistant to Johannes Ludwig Ebert in Würzburg. From 1931 he was an assistant to Hans von Halban at the University of Zürich. From 1937 he taught at the University of Tübingen, where he became full professor in 1942 and director of the newly created institute for physical chemistry. He became an emeritus professor in 1971.

He focused on spectrophotometry, electrochemistry, and electrolyte solutions (reviewing the Debye-Hückel theory and Onsager's theory of solvent mixtures), vapor pressure measurements on binary systems, and reflection spectroscopy. In 1959 he was elected as a member of the Leopoldina.

== Books ==
- Kortüm, Gustav; Bockris, John O'Mara (1951). Textbook of Electrochemistry. Elsevier.
- Kortüm, Gustav (1969). Reflectance spectroscopy Principles, methods, applications. Berlin: Springer. ISBN 9783642880711. OCLC 714802320.
- Kolorimetrie - Photometrie und Spektrometrie. Eine Anleitung zur Ausführung von Absorptions-, Emissions-, Fluoreszenz-, Streuungs-, Trübungs- und Reflexionsmessungen, Springer, 1955.
- Elektrolytlösungen, Akademische Verlagsgesellschaft m. b. H., Leipzig 1941
- with Heinrich Lachmann: Einführung in die chemische Thermodynamik. Wiley-VCH, 1981.

== See also ==
- Diffuse reflectance spectroscopy
