= Patrick Blackett =

British physicist (1897–1974)

The Right Honourable The Lord Blackett of Chelsea OM CH FRS
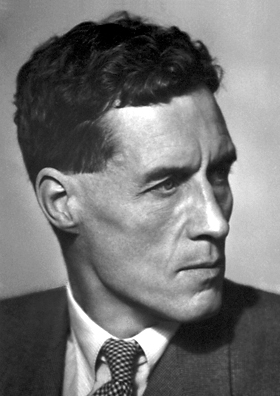
- Blackett in 1948

52nd President of the Royal Society
- In office 1965–1970
- Preceded by: Lord Florey
- Succeeded by: Sir Alan Hodgkin

Personal details
- Born: Patrick Maynard Stuart Blackett; 18 November 1897 London, England
- Died: 13 July 1974 (aged 76) London, England
- Resting place: Kensal Green Cemetery
- Spouse: Costanza Bayon (m. 1924)
- Children: 2
- Relatives: Edmund Blacket (great-uncle); Marion Milner (sister)
- Education: Royal Naval College, Osborne; University of Cambridge (BA)
- Known for: First artificial nuclear transmutation
- Awards: Royal Medal (1940); Nobel Prize in Physics (1948); Copley Medal (1956)
- Scientific career
- Fields: Physics
- Workplaces: King's College London; Birkbeck, University of London; Victoria University of Manchester; Imperial College London
- Academic advisors: Ernest Rutherford
- Doctoral students: Edward Bullard; Mrinal Kumar Das Gupta; Malcolm Haines; James Hamilton; Keith Runcorn; Roberto Salmeron; Arnold Wolfendale
- Other notable students: J. Robert Oppenheimer

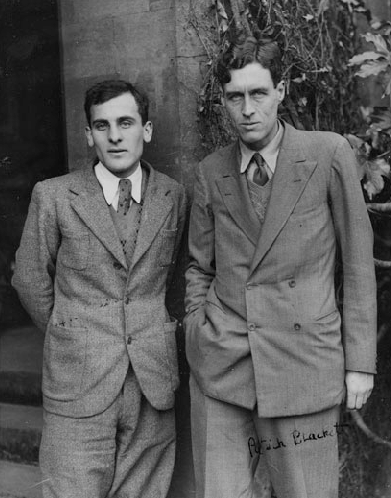
Giuseppe Occhialini and Blackett (right), 1932 or 1933

Patrick Maynard Stuart Blackett, Baron Blackett of Chelsea (18 November 1897 – 13 July 1974), was a British experimental physicist and life peer who received the 1948 Nobel Prize in Physics. In 1925, he was the first person to prove that radioactivity could cause the nuclear transmutation of one chemical element to another. He also made major contributions to the Allied war effort in World War II, advising on military strategy and developing operational research.

In the war's aftermath, Blackett continued his scientific work, but also became outspoken on political matters. He advocated for restraints on the military use of atomic energy. He was a proponent for Third World development and for reducing the gap between rich and poor. In the 1950s and '60s, he was a key advisor to the Labour Party on science and technology policy. By the time of his death in 1974, Blackett had become controversial to the point that the Times obituary referred to him as the "Radical Nobel-Prize Winning Physicist."

== Early life and education ==
Patrick Maynard Stuart Blackett was born on 18 November 1897 in Kensington, London, the son of Caroline (née Maynard) and Arthur Stuart Blackett, a stockbroker. His younger sister was Marion Milner, a noted psychoanalyst. His paternal grandfather, the Rev. Henry Blackett, brother of Australian architect Edmund Blacket, was for many years Vicar of Croydon. His maternal grandfather, Charles Maynard, was an officer in the Royal Artillery at the time of the Indian Mutiny. The Blackett family lived successively in Kensington, Kenley, Woking and Guildford, and Surrey, where he went to preparatory school. His main hobbies were model aeroplanes and crystal radio. When he interviewed for entrance to the Royal Naval College, Osborne, Isle of Wight, Charles Rolls had just completed his cross-channel flight the previous day and Patrick, who had tracked the flight on his crystal set, was able to expound lengthily on the subject. He was accepted and spent two years there before moving on to Dartmouth where he was "usually head of his class."

In August 1914 at the outbreak of World War I, Blackett was assigned to active service as a midshipman. He was transferred to the Cape Verde Islands on HMS Carnarvon and was present at the Battle of the Falkland Islands. He was then transferred to HMS Barham and saw much action at the Battle of Jutland. While on the Barham, Blackett was co-inventor of a gunnery device on which the Admiralty took out a patent. In 1916, he applied to join the RNAS but his application was refused. In October of that year, he became a sub-lieutenant on HMS P17 on Dover patrol, and in July 1917 he was posted to HMS Sturgeon in the Harwich Force under Admiral Tyrwhitt. Blackett was concerned by the poor quality of British gunnery in the Harwich Force when compared with that of the enemy. In May 1918, he was promoted to lieutenant, but by then had decided to leave the Navy. He started to read science textbooks as he planned his post-war career.

In January 1919, the Admiralty sent the officers whose training had been interrupted by the war to the University of Cambridge for a course of general duties. On his first night at Magdalene College, Cambridge, he met Kingsley Martin and Geoffrey Webb, later recalling that he had never before, in his naval training, heard intellectual conversation. Blackett was impressed by the prestigious Cavendish Laboratory, and left the Navy to study physics under Ernest Rutherford at Cambridge, where he graduated with a Bachelor of Arts in 1921. He became a Fellow of King's College London in 1923.

== Career and research ==
Rutherford had discovered that the nucleus of the nitrogen atom could be disintegrated by firing fast alpha particles into nitrogen. He asked Blackett to use a cloud chamber to find visible tracks of this disintegration, and by 1925, Blackett had taken 23,000 photographs showing 415,000 tracks of ionized particles. Eight of these were forked, and this showed that the nitrogen atom-alpha particle combination had formed an atom of fluorine, which then disintegrated into an isotope of oxygen 17 and a proton. Blackett published the results of his experiments in 1925. He thus became the first person to deliberately transmute one element into another.

During his time at Cambridge, Blackett was the head tutor of the young American graduate student, J. Robert Oppenheimer. The latter's desire to study theoretical physics rather than focus on lab work brought him into conflict with Blackett. The commonly told story of Oppenheimer's retaliatory attempt to poison Blackett is likely fictional and has been directly disputed by Oppenheimer's grandson. Additionally, Cambridge has no record of any attempted poisoning.

Blackett spent one year (1924–1925) in Göttingen, Germany, working with James Franck on atomic spectra. In 1932, Blackett partnered with Giuseppe Occhialini to devise a system of Geiger counters which took photographs only when a cosmic ray particle traversed the chamber. They found 500 tracks of high energy cosmic ray particles in 700 automatic exposures. In 1933, Blackett discovered fourteen tracks which confirmed the existence of the positron and revealed the now instantly recognisable opposing spiral traces of positron/electron pair production. He and Occhialini published their findings in a landmark 1933 paper in Proceedings of the Royal Society A. This work, combined with his research on annihilation radiation, made Blackett a leading expert in the new theory of antimatter.

In 1933, Blackett moved to Birkbeck, University of London, as Professor of Physics, and stayed for four years. In 1937, he went to the Victoria University of Manchester, where he was elected to the Langworthy Professorship and created a major international research laboratory. The Blackett Memorial Hall and Blackett Lecture Theatre at the University of Manchester were subsequently named after him.

In 1947, Blackett introduced a theory to account for the Earth's magnetic field as a function of its rotation, with the hope that it would unify both the electromagnetic force and the force of gravity. He spent a number of years developing high-quality magnetometers to test his theory, but eventually found it to be without merit. However, his work on the subject led him into geophysics, where he later helped process data relating to paleomagnetism, and also provided strong evidence for continental drift.

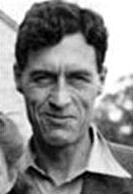
Blackett ca. 1950

In 1953, Blackett was appointed head of the Physics Department at Imperial College London, and retired from there in July 1963. The Physics department building of Imperial College, the Blackett Laboratory, is named in his honour.

In 1957, Blackett gave the presidential address ("Technology and World Advancement") to the British Association meeting in Dublin In 1965, he delivered the MacMillan Memorial Lecture to the Institution of Engineers and Shipbuilders in Scotland. He chose the subject "Continental Drift".

=== World War II and operational research ===
In 1935, Blackett was invited to join the Aeronautical Research Committee chaired by Sir Henry Tizard. The committee was effective in advocating for the early installation of Radar for air defence. At the beginning of World War II, Blackett served on various committees and spent time at the Royal Aircraft Establishment (RAE) Farnborough, where he made a major contribution to the design of the Mark XIV bomb sight, which allowed bombs to be released without a level bombing run beforehand. In 1940–41, he served on the MAUD Committee which concluded that an atomic bomb was feasible. He disagreed with the committee's conclusion that Britain could produce an atomic bomb by 1943, and he recommended that the project should be discussed with the Americans.

In August 1940, Blackett became scientific adviser to Lieutenant General Sir Frederick Pile, Commander in Chief of Anti-Aircraft Command and thus began the work that resulted in the field of study known as operational research (OR). He was director of Operational Research with the Admiralty from 1942 to 1945, and his work with E. J. Williams improved the survival odds of convoys, presented counter-intuitive but correct recommendations for the armour-plating of aircraft, and achieved many other successes. His aim, he said, was to base military strategy on numbers, not "gusts of emotions." During the war he criticised the assumptions in Lord Cherwell's dehousing paper and sided with Tizard who argued that fewer resources should go to RAF Bomber Command for the area bombing offensive and more to the other armed forces. Blackett's studies had shown the ineffectiveness of the area bombing strategies, as opposed to the importance of fighting off the German U-boats, which were heavily affecting the war effort with their sinkings of merchant ships. In this opinion, he chafed against the existing military authority and was cut out of various circles of communications. However, after the war, the Allied Strategic Bombing Survey proved Blackett correct.

=== Politics ===
While an undergraduate, Blackett befriended Kingsley Martin, the future editor of the New Statesman; their talks on politics contributed to Blackett's move to the left. He later identified himself as a socialist, and often campaigned on behalf of the Labour Party. In the aftermath of World War II, Blackett became known for his radical political opinions, which included a belief that Britain ought not to develop atomic weapons. His biographer Mary Jo Nye noted:

Blackett became the first person to openly argue that the United States had used the atomic bomb in Japan "not so much as the last military act of the Second World War, as the first act of the cold diplomatic war with Russia." Outraged Americans characterized Blackett's statements and his opposition to their development of atomic weapons as a Stalinist apology full of political prejudices. George Orwell in 1949 included Blackett on a blacklist of thirty-eight crypto-communists or fellow-travellers that Orwell drew up for the British Foreign Office.

It was subsequently revealed that Blackett was under MI5 investigation during this time. As a result of his political controversies, he was considered too far left for the post-war Labour Government to employ, and he returned to academic life.

Blackett's internationalism found expression in his strong support for India. In 1947 he met Jawaharlal Nehru, who sought the scientist's advice on the research and development needs of the Indian armed forces. For the next 20 years, Blackett was a frequent visitor and advisor to India on military and civil science. These visits deepened his concern for the underprivileged and the poor. He was convinced that their problems could be overcome by applying science and technology. He used his prestige in the scientific community to try to persuade fellow scientists that one of their first duties should be to help ensure a decent life for all mankind. Before underdevelopment became a popular issue, Blackett proposed in a 1957 presidential address to the British Association for the Advancement of Science that his country should devote 1% of its national income to the economic improvement of the Third World, and he was later one of the prime movers in the founding of the Overseas Development Institute.

During the 13 years when the Labour Party was out of office, Blackett was the senior member of a group of scientists who met regularly to discuss scientific and technological policy. This group grew in influence when Harold Wilson assumed leadership of the Party. Blackett's suggestions directly led to the creation of the Ministry of Technology as soon as the Wilson government was formed, and he insisted that a top priority should be revival of Britain's computer industry. Blackett did not enter open politics, but worked for a year as a civil servant. He remained deputy chairman of the Minister's Advisory Council throughout the administration's life, and was also personal scientific adviser to the Minister.

=== Publications ===
- Military and Political Consequences of Atomic Energy. London: Turnstile Press. 1948. LCCN 48010864. Published the following year in the U.S. under the title Fear, War, and the Bomb.
- Atomic Weapons and East/West Relations. Cambridge University Press. 1956. LCCN 57013509.
- Studies of War: Nuclear and Conventional. New York: Hill and Wang. 1962. LCCN 62019962.

=== Influence in fiction ===
- Blackett's theories of planetary magnetism and gravity were taken up by the science fiction author James Blish, who cited the Blackett effect as the theoretical "basis" behind his "spindizzy" antigravity drive.
- In his close friend C. P. Snow's novel sequence Strangers and Brothers (1940–1974), aspects of Blackett's personality are drawn upon for the left-wing physicist Francis Getliffe.
- Blackett and his dictum, "You can't run a war on gusts of emotion", appear in the 'alternative' WWII novel, Gravity's Rainbow.

== Personal life ==
Blackett married Costanza Bayon (1899–1986) in March 1924. They had a daughter, Giovanna (born 1926) and a son, Nicolas (born 1928).

Blackett was an agnostic or atheist.

Blackett died on 13 July 1974 in London at the age of 76. His ashes are buried at the Kensal Green Cemetery in London.

Bernard Lovell wrote of Blackett: "Those who worked with Blackett in the laboratory were dominated by his immensely powerful personality, and those who knew him elsewhere soon discovered that the public image thinly veiled a sensitive and humane spirit."

Edward Bullard said that he was the most versatile and best loved physicist of his generation and that his achievement was also without rival: "he was wonderfully intelligent, charming, fun to be with, dignified and handsome."

== Recognition ==
=== Memberships ===
Year	Organisation	Type	Ref.
1933	Royal Society	Fellow	
1966	National Academy of Sciences	International Member	

=== Awards ===
Year	Organisation	Award	Citation	Ref.
1940	Royal Society	Royal Medal	"For his studies of cosmic rays and the showers of particles which they produce, for his share in the discovery of the positive electron, for his work on mesons and many other experimental achievements."	
1948	Royal Swedish Academy of Sciences	Nobel Prize in Physics	"For his development of the Wilson cloud chamber method, and his discoveries therewith in the fields of nuclear physics and cosmic radiation."	
1956	Royal Society	Copley Medal	"In recognition of his outstanding studies of cosmic ray showers and heavy mesons and in the field of palaeomagnetism."	

=== Honours ===
Year	Country	Honour	Ref.
1965	United Kingdom	Order of the Companions of Honour	
1967	United Kingdom	Order of Merit	
1969	United Kingdom	Baron	

== Commemoration ==
The Blackett Laboratory is part of Imperial College Faculty of Natural Sciences and has housed the Physics Department since its completion in 1961.

Blackett crater on the Moon is named after him.

In 2016, the house that Blackett lived in from 1953 to 1969 (48 Paultons Square, Chelsea, London) received an English Heritage blue plaque.

In July 2022, the Royal Navy named an experimental ship after Blackett in honour of his service to the Royal Navy and to the country; XV Patrick Blackett will be used by the Royal Navy to experiment with autonomous technologies.

The Patrick M. S. Blackett Institute in Erice, Sicily, a teaching and conference venue of the Ettore Majorana Foundation and Centre for Scientific Culture.

== In popular culture ==
Blackett was portrayed by James D'Arcy in the 2023 film Oppenheimer.

== See also ==
- List of presidents of the Royal Society

Academic offices
Preceded by Lawrence Bragg	5th Langworthy Professor at the University of Manchester; 1937–53	Succeeded by Samuel Devons
Professional and academic associations
Preceded by Howard Florey	52nd President of the Royal Society; 1965–1970	Succeeded by Alan Lloyd Hodgkin
