= Blackett effect =

Hypothetical mechanism

The Blackett effect, also called gravitational magnetism, is the hypothetical generation of a magnetic field by an uncharged, rotating body. This effect has not been observed.

== History ==
Gravitational magnetism was proposed by the German-British physicist Arthur Schuster as an explanation for the magnetic field of the Earth, but was found nonexistent in a 1923 experiment by H. A. Wilson. The hypothesis was revived by the British physicist P. M. S. Blackett in 1947 when he proposed that a rotating body should generate a magnetic field proportional to its angular momentum. This was never generally accepted, and by the 1950s even Blackett felt it had been refuted.^{, pp. 39–43}

The Blackett effect was used by the science fiction writer James Blish in his series Cities in Flight (1955–1962) as the basis for his fictional stardrive, the spindizzy.
