= Francis de Chaumont =

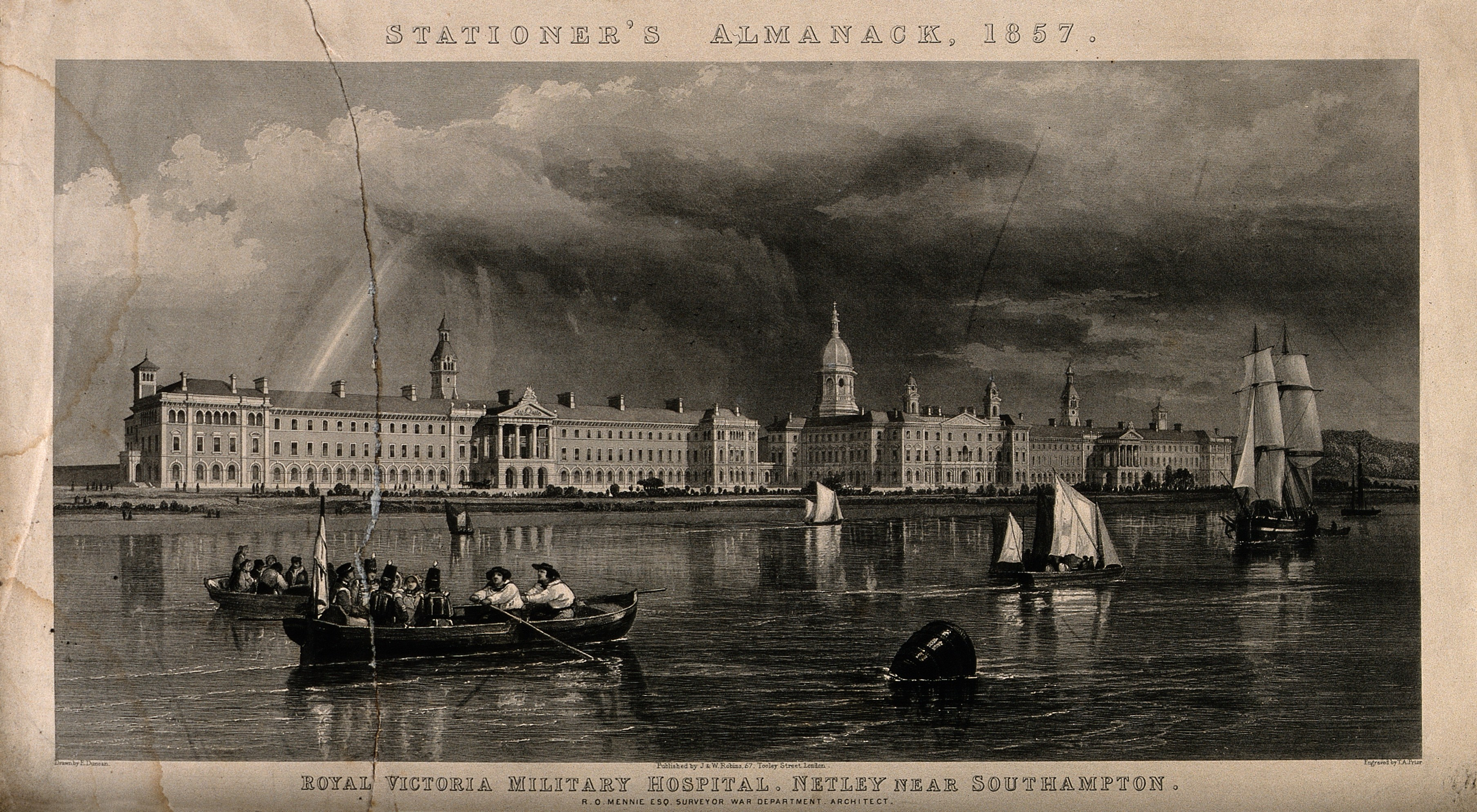
Line engraving of Royal Victoria Military Hospital from Southampton Water produced by T. A. Prior in 1857

Surgeon Major Francis Stephen Bennet François de Chaumont FRS (7 April 1833 – 18 April 1888) was a British Army surgeon.

== Life ==
de Chaumont was born in Edinburgh to a Scottish mother and French father. He was educated at Edinburgh High School and the University of Edinburgh.

He entered the British Army medical service and was posted as assistant surgeon in 1854 to the Depot Battalion, Parkhurst Barracks, Isle of Wight. In 1885 he served with the Rifle Brigade in the Crimean War and was present at the Siege of Sevastopol. He again served with the Rifle Brigade during the Indian Mutiny (1856–61) and for a year in Malta (1861–62).

When the Army Medical School was moved from Chatham, Kent to Netley, Hampshire, Surgeon Major de Chaumont was appointed in 1866 Assistant Professor of Military Hygiene, being later retired on half-pay in 1876 when made Professor on the death of his predecessor, Professor Edmund Alexander Parkes.

He was elected a Fellow of the Royal Society on 12 June 1879.

He died in 1888 at his house in Woolston, Southampton and was buried at St Mary Extra, Sholing. He had married Eleanor Tempest Gray in 1865 and had a large family.
