= Test Shot Starfish =

American electronic music group

- Origin: Los Angeles, California, U.S.
- Genres: Ambient, Electronic, IDM
- Years active: 1999-present
- Members: Kyle Schember and Ryan Stuit

Test Shot Starfish is an American electronic music production duo formed in 1999 by Kyle Schember and Ryan Stuit.

== History ==
The duo met on the film set for Forever Fabulous in Los Angeles in the late 90s. Their first EP was released in 2003 and a self titled full length album in 2005. Their name refers to the Starfish Prime nuclear test from 1962, the largest nuclear detonation in space.

=== Music style ===
Test Shot Starfish "is the sound of space, if it had one – at least in this parsec". For example, their song "LC-39A" is inspired by the launch pad of the same name which launched Apollo missions, the Space Shuttle, and Falcon Heavy rockets. Another example is the track "Sputnik" which was named after the first artificial satellite. The song contained samples of news clips and audio from the satellite itself. Their music is also commonly used in SpaceX's YouTube and X livestreams of rocket launches.

== Discography ==
Studio albums

- Test Shot Starfish (2005)
- Music for Space (2018)
- Music for Space Sleep (2020)
- Earth Analog (2022)
- Test Flight (2025)
- Aperion (2026)

Extended plays

- Test Shot Starfish EP (2003)

Singles

- Mars (2019)
- Cities in Flight (2019)
- The New Astronauts (2020)
- Crew (2020)
- Moon (featuring Everyday Astronaut) (2021)
