= Two-stream approximation =

In models of radiative transfer, the two-stream approximation is a discrete ordinate approximation in which radiation propagating along only two discrete directions is considered. In other words, the two-stream approximation assumes the intensity is constant with angle in the upward hemisphere, with a different constant value in the downward hemisphere. It was first used by Arthur Schuster in 1905. The two ordinates are chosen such that the model captures the essence of radiative transport in light scattering atmospheres. A practical benefit of the approach is that it reduces the computational cost of integrating the radiative transfer equation. The two-stream approximation is commonly used in parameterizations of radiative transport in global circulation models and in weather forecasting models, such as the WRF. There are a large number of applications of the two-stream approximation, including variants such as the Kubelka-Munk approximation. It is the simplest approximation that can be used to explain common observations inexplicable by single-scattering arguments, such as the brightness and color of the clear sky, the brightness of clouds, the whiteness of a glass of milk, and the darkening of sand upon wetting. The two-stream approximation comes in many variants, such as the Quadrature, and Hemispheric constant models. Mathematical descriptions of the two-stream approximation are given in several books. The two-stream approximation is separate from the Eddington approximation (and its derivatives such as Delta-Eddington), which instead assumes that the intensity is linear in the cosine of the incidence angle (from +1 to -1), with no discontinuity at the horizon.

== See also ==
- List of atmospheric radiative transfer codes
