= Diffuse reflection =

Reflection with light scattered at random angles

Diffuse and specular reflection from a glossy surface. The rays represent luminous intensity, which varies according to Lambert's cosine law for an ideal diffuse reflector.

Diffuse reflection is the reflection of light or other waves or particles from a surface such that a ray incident on the surface is scattered at many angles rather than at just one angle as in the case of specular reflection. An ideal diffuse reflecting surface is said to exhibit Lambertian reflection, meaning that there is equal luminance when viewed from all directions lying in the half-space adjacent to the surface.

A surface built from a non-absorbing powder such as plaster, or from fibers such as paper, or from a polycrystalline material such as white marble, reflects light diffusely with great efficiency. Many common materials exhibit a mixture of specular and diffuse reflection.

The visibility of objects, excluding light-emitting ones, is primarily caused by diffuse reflection of light: it is diffusely-scattered light that forms the image of the object in an observer's eye over a wide range of angles of the observer with respect to the object.

== Mechanism ==
Figure 1 – General mechanism of diffuse reflection by a solid surface (refraction phenomena not represented)

Figure 2 – Diffuse reflection from an irregular surface

Diffuse reflection from solids is generally not due to surface roughness. A flat surface is indeed required to give specular reflection, but it does not prevent diffuse reflection. A piece of highly polished white marble remains white; no amount of polishing will turn it into a mirror. Polishing produces some specular reflection, but the remaining light continues to be diffusely reflected.

The most general mechanism by which a surface gives diffuse reflection does not involve exactly the surface: most of the light is contributed by scattering centers beneath the surface, as illustrated in Figure 1. If one were to imagine that the figure represents snow, and that the polygons are its (transparent) ice crystallites, an impinging ray is partially reflected (a few percent) by the first particle, enters in it, is again reflected by the interface with the second particle, enters in it, impinges on the third, and so on, generating a series of "primary" scattered rays in random directions, which, in turn, through the same mechanism, generate a large number of "secondary" scattered rays, which generate "tertiary" rays, and so forth. All these rays walk through the snow crystallites, which do not absorb light, until they arrive at the surface and exit in random directions. The result is that the light that was sent out is returned in all directions, so that snow is white despite being made of transparent material (ice crystals).

For simplicity, "reflections" are spoken of here, but more generally the interface between the small particles that constitute many materials is irregular on a scale comparable with light wavelength, so diffuse light is generated at each interface, rather than a single reflected ray, but the story can be told the same way.

This mechanism is very general, because almost all common materials are made of "small things" held together. Mineral materials are generally polycrystalline: one can describe them as made of a 3D mosaic of small, irregularly shaped defective crystals. Organic materials are usually composed of fibers or cells, with their membranes and their complex internal structure. And each interface, inhomogeneity or imperfection can deviate, reflect or scatter light, reproducing the above mechanism.

Few materials do not cause diffuse reflection: among these are metals, which do not allow light to enter; gases, liquids, glass, and transparent plastics (which have a liquid-like amorphous microscopic structure); single crystals, such as some gems or a salt crystal; and some other materials, such as the tissues which make the cornea and the lens of an eye. These materials can reflect diffusely, however, if their surface is microscopically rough, like in a frost glass (Figure 2), or, of course, if their homogeneous structure deteriorates, as in cataracts of the eye lens.

A surface may also exhibit both specular and diffuse reflection, as is the case, for example, of glossy paints as used in home painting, which give also a fraction of specular reflection, while matte paints give almost exclusively diffuse reflection.

Most materials can give some specular reflection, provided that their surface can be polished to eliminate irregularities comparable with the light wavelength (a fraction of a micrometer). Depending on the material and surface roughness, reflection may be mostly specular, mostly diffuse, or anywhere in between. A few materials, like liquids and glasses, lack the internal subdivisions which produce the subsurface scattering mechanism described above, and so give only specular reflection. Among common materials, only polished metals can reflect light specularly with high efficiency, as in aluminum or silver usually used in mirrors. All other common materials, even when perfectly polished, usually give not more than a few percent specular reflection, except in particular cases, such as grazing angle reflection by a lake, or the total reflection of a glass prism, or when structured in certain complex configurations such as the silvery skin of many fish species or the reflective surface of a dielectric mirror. Diffuse reflection can be highly efficient, as in white materials, due to the summing up of the many subsurface reflections.

== Colored objects ==
Up to this point white objects have been discussed, which do not absorb light. But the above scheme continues to be valid in the case that the material is absorbent. In this case, diffused rays will lose some wavelengths during their walk in the material, and will emerge colored.

Diffusion affects the color of objects in a substantial manner because it determines the average path of light in the material, and hence to which extent the various wavelengths are absorbed. Red ink looks black when it stays in its bottle. Its vivid color is only perceived when it is placed on a scattering material (e.g. paper). This is so because light's path through the paper fibers (and through the ink) is only a fraction of millimeter long. However, light from the bottle has crossed several centimeters of ink and has been heavily absorbed, even in its red wavelengths.

And, when a colored object has both diffuse and specular reflection, usually only the diffuse component is colored. A cherry reflects diffusely red light, absorbs all other colors and has a specular reflection which is essentially white (if the incident light is white light). This is quite general, because, except for metals, the reflectivity of most materials depends on their refractive index, which varies little with the wavelength (though it is this variation that causes the chromatic dispersion in a prism), so that all colors are reflected nearly with the same intensity.

== Importance for vision ==
The vast majority of visible objects are seen primarily by diffuse reflection from their surface. Exceptions include objects with polished (specularly reflecting) surfaces, and objects that themselves emit light. Rayleigh scattering is responsible for the blue color of the sky, and Mie scattering for the white color of the water droplets in clouds.

== Interreflection ==
Diffuse interreflection is a process whereby light reflected from an object strikes other objects in the surrounding area, illuminating them. Diffuse interreflection specifically describes light reflected from objects which are not shiny or specular. In real life terms what this means is that light is reflected off non-shiny surfaces such as the ground, walls, or fabric, to reach areas not directly in view of a light source. If the diffuse surface is colored, the reflected light is also colored, resulting in similar coloration of surrounding objects.

In 3D computer graphics, diffuse interreflection is an important component of global illumination. There are a number of ways to model diffuse interreflection when rendering a scene. Radiosity and photon mapping are two commonly used methods.

== Spectroscopy ==
Diffuse reflectance spectroscopy can be used to determine the absorption spectra of powdered samples in cases where transmission spectroscopy is not feasible. This applies to UV-Vis-NIR spectroscopy or mid-infrared spectroscopy.

== See also ==
- Diffuser
- List of reflected light sources
- Oren–Nayar reflectance model
- Reflectivity
- Remission
