= Extender (ink) =

Transparent material added to printing inks

An extender, also known as a filler, in printing ink technology is a white transparent, or semi-transparent, component whose purpose is to reduce the cost of the ink, by increasing the area covered by a given weight of pigment. They generally have little colouring power.

== Composition and properties ==
Extenders are typically white inorganic solids. Their transparency in inks is frequently due to their refractive indices being similar to the ink, as opposed to opaque pigments, which are generally substantially higher.

== Use ==
Extenders primarily serve to reduce the cost of the ink, but can also impart useful properties to it. They can reduce the colour strength of the ink without adding any white colour to it, which is useful if the pigment in the ink is very tinctorially strong. Extenders can also be used to adjust the ink's consistency and viscosity.
