= Jeff Forshaw =

British particle physicist and author

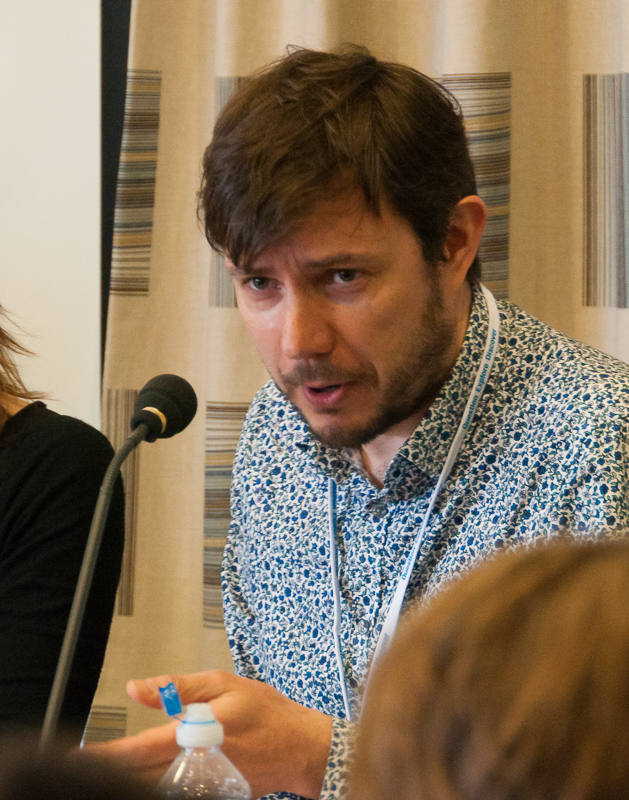
- Forshaw in 2013
- Born: Jeffrey Robert Forshaw; 26 February 1968 (age 58)
- Education: Hesketh Fletcher High School, Wigan and Leigh College
- Alma mater: University of Oxford (BA); University of Manchester (PhD)
- Known for: Particle physics, quantum physics, theoretical physics
- Spouse: Gail Bradbrook (div.) Naomi Baker (div.)
- Children: 2
- Awards: Maxwell Medal and Prize (1999); Kelvin Prize (2013); Fellow of the Royal Society (2026)
- Scientific career
- Fields: Particle physics
- Workplaces: University of Manchester
- Thesis: The Parton content of the photon and photon-induced minijets (1992)
- Website: www.hep.man.ac.uk/u/forshaw

Jeffrey Robert Forshaw FRS (born 1968) is a British theoretical physicist and particle physicist with a special interest in quantum chromodynamics (QCD): the study of the behaviour of subatomic particles, using data from the HERA particle accelerator, Tevatron particle accelerator and the Large Hadron Collider (LHC) at CERN. He is Professor of Theoretical Physics in the Department of Physics and Astronomy at the University of Manchester.

He is the co-author of five books, including the popular science books Why Does E=mc²?, The Quantum Universe and Universal: A guide to the cosmos, co-written with physicist Brian Cox. He has also written over 100 peer reviewed papers published in scientific journals and speaks at international science festivals for children and adults. He frequently acts as science consultant to the BBC and other media and is a columnist for The Observer.

Forshaw is a recipient of the Maxwell Medal and Prize for his contribution to particle physics, and the Kelvin Prize from the Institute of Physics for his contribution to the public understanding of physics.

== Education ==
Forshaw attended Hesketh Fletcher High School and studied A levels at Wigan and Leigh College where he considered his teachers, Jim Breithaupt, Alan Skinner and Jean Wadsworth an important influence on his future career. He went on to study physics at Oriel College, Oxford graduating with a first class Bachelor of Arts degree in physics in 1989, followed by a PhD in Theoretical Physics from the University of Manchester in 1992 for research on the parton content of the photon and photon-induced minijets.

== Career and research ==
From 1992 to 1995, he worked as a postdoctoral research scientist at the Rutherford Appleton Laboratory near Didcot in Oxfordshire, in the group led by noted particle physicist Frank Close. While studying he intended to become a school teacher but began lecturing at university level after his PhD. He began his friendship and eventual collaboration with Brian Cox around 1995 when he was Cox's lecturer in Advanced Quantum Field Theory as they were the same age, despite being student and teacher.

In 2004, he became professor of particle physics at the University of Manchester School of Physics and Astronomy. At Manchester he engaged in experimental and theoretical research in the field of particle physics, with particular interest in the behaviours of particles in high energy colliders as at the ATLAS experiment and Compact Muon Solenoid (CMS) experiments, part of the Large Hadron Collider particle accelerator research at CERN in Geneva, Switzerland. He said of his theoretical physics research,

As a theoretical physicist, most of my time is spent doing calculations that are wrong. It's a humbling exercise, a massive dose of humility.

He has written over 100 peer-reviewed articles in scientific journals, including papers on ordering gluon emissions, quantum field theory and holographic wavefunction of mesons. Forshaw and his frequent co-author Cox have stated the peer review process of science results publishing is important because it ensures that minimum standards are met in the scientific community and gives due attribution to all associates working on the piece who are finalising the presentation of the paper, and blogging research before it is published should be avoided.

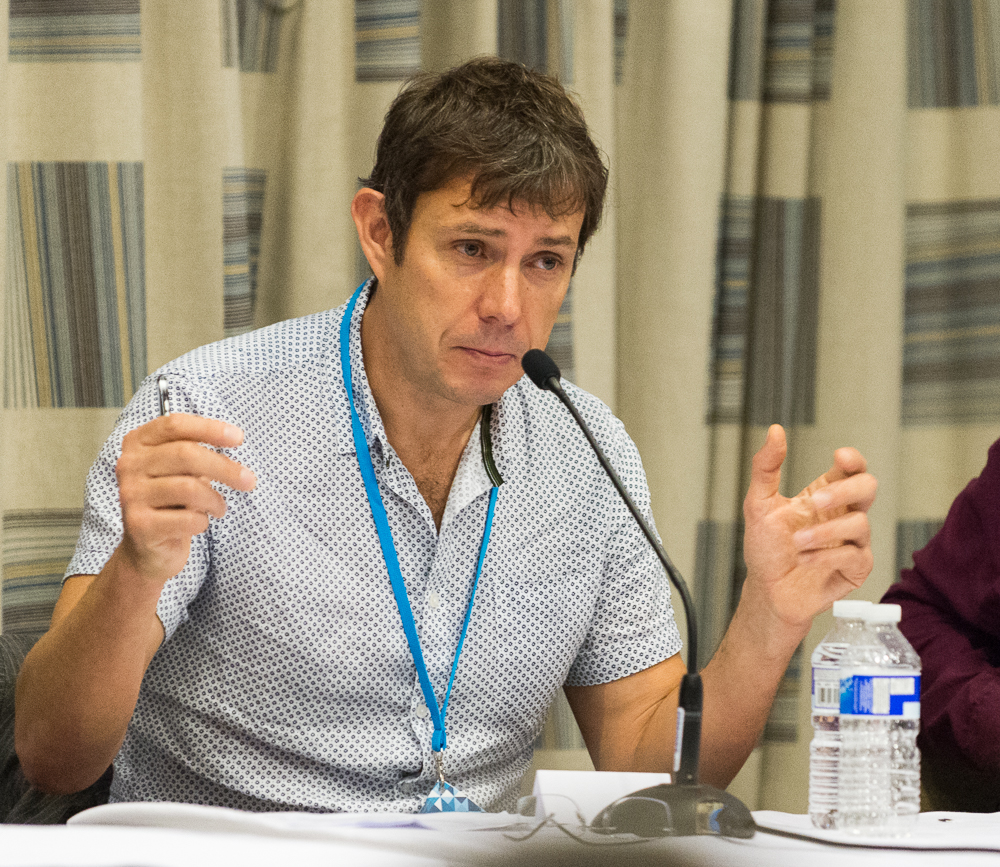
Forshaw at QED: Question, Explore, Discover conference, 2017

As an educator, Forshaw is keen to encourage the idea that basic principles and theories in particle physics should be introduced to children in school in order to encourage understanding of the scientific method and use of evidence-based thinking at a young age.

In 2008, he added his voice to the Science and Technology Facilities Council (STFC) campaign against spending cuts to UK physics budgets in a letter to the then Secretary of State at the Department for Innovation, Universities and Skills, John Denham, which was signed by around 350 prominent physicists from the UK theoretical particle physics community. The letter pointed out the adverse effects the cuts would have, not only to physics research in the UK, but also in discouraging future students of astronomy, particle physics and science in general. When asked whether investment in physics could potentially contribute to the UK economy he pointed out,

The world has been revolutionised by fundamental research into quantum physics done 60 years ago and now there are billions of transistors inside every home computer. They are a key ingredient of the microchip.

He also encourages people to see the relevance of quantum physics in everyday life and not purely as an academic discipline, using solar panels and lasers as examples of practical everyday applications. In his many public lectures he has been described as "deeply enthusiastic about his subject" and "entertaining and informative."

Forshaw often visits schools and colleges to speak in front of young people about aspects of his work and has appeared on children's television in the UK explaining concepts such as the Higgs boson on BBC television programme Newsround for children aged six to twelve. He is an ambassador for educational charity Potential Plus UK which aims to support the emotional and learning needs of gifted and exceptional children. Forshaw also regularly contributes at SciBar events (literally science in a bar) and Café Scientifique events in the UK. He has supervised several PhD students and postdocs.

=== Publications and media ===
Forshaw writes frequent popular science articles explaining complex concepts in physics for the press and magazine publications. He has written on subjects such as matter and antimatter, the Big Bang, the existence of the Higgs boson, quantum computers, supersymmetry, the Planck satellite, dark matter and the technology of nuclear fusion. He has also co-authored a set of physics talks with educational support materials for TED Studies entitled Physics – The Edge of Knowledge which is designed to be used online by teachers and students. It explores the relationship between the laws of nature and quantum physics from subatomic particles to the wider universe. Other popular science publications include:

- QCD and the Pomeron is a text book written with Douglas A. Ross (1997) written for theoretical and experimental particle physicists and those in the field of applied mathematics and investigates the pomeron, an object in high energy particle physics. It was described as the "First book on the physics of the pomeron, fills a gaping hole in the literature."
- Dynamics and Relativity written with Gavin Smith (2009) is an undergraduate level text book on the physics behind classical mechanics and relativity.
- Why Does E=mc²? written with Brian Cox (2009) is a popular science book exploring Einstein's Theory of relativity and what it means in relation to topics such as the Big Bang and the Large Hadron Collider. The book received very positive reviews for being easy to read and entertaining, despite dealing with complex physical theories and mathematics, from newspapers such as The Guardian, New York Journal of Books and New Scientist, and was shortlisted for the Royal Society science book prize in 2010.
- The Quantum Universe written with Brian Cox (2012) is a popular science book that attempts to explain quantum physics. Economist magazine listed it as one of its 'Books of the Year' for 2011. It received favourable reviews from The Guardian and the Economist while The Daily Telegraph described it as enjoyable but "not an easy read," and The Independent found the theoretical sections stodgy.
- Universal, a guide to the cosmos written with Brian Cox (2016) explores fundamental questions about the universe and the science of astronomy as it attempts to understand it. Universal was also well received, with the New Scientist listing it as one of their Great Christmas books, describing it, "Rarely has a difficult subject been rendered so accessible." The Guardian referred to it as a magnum opus and The Big Issue focussed on the book's encouragement of critical thinking. Universal was featured by Symmetry, the particle physics journal funded by the US Department of Energy and described as a beautiful book which excels on many levels.
- Forshaw is series editor of the Manchester Physics Series of textbooks aimed at university undergraduates and postgraduates.

Forshaw was science consultant for several BBC Television series and programmes including the following:

- The Science of Doctor Who, documentary, 2013
- Wonders of Life series, 2012
- Wonders of the Universe series, 2010 and 2011
- A Night With The Stars, documentary, 2011
- Wonders of the Solar System series, 2009 and 2010
- Horizon:- What on Earth is wrong with Gravity? 2009
- Horizon – Do You Know What Time It Is? 2008
- Naked Science: Time Machine for National Geographic channel, 2008
- Equinox: The Big G, 1998

Of his writing and efforts to bring physics to the wider public he said,

(Science) is very beautiful...that's why I do it. For me that's the big passion, so that people should get to see how beautiful physics is.

=== Awards and honours ===
In 1999, Forshaw was awarded the Maxwell Medal and Prize from the Institute of Physics for his outstanding contribution to particle physics. In 2013, Forshaw received the Kelvin Medal from the Institute of Physics for his outstanding contribution to making complex physics accessible and understandable to the public. In 2010, Cox and Forshaw's book Why Does E=mc²? was shortlisted for the Royal Society science book prize. In 2026 he was elected a Fellow of the Royal Society.

== Personal life ==
Forshaw lives in Manchester and has two daughters. He was married to scientist and environmental campaigner Gail Bradbrook. He was also married to Naomi Baker, an academic at the University of Manchester, with whom he has two daughters.
