= Department of Physics and Astronomy, University of Manchester =

Department of the University of Manchester

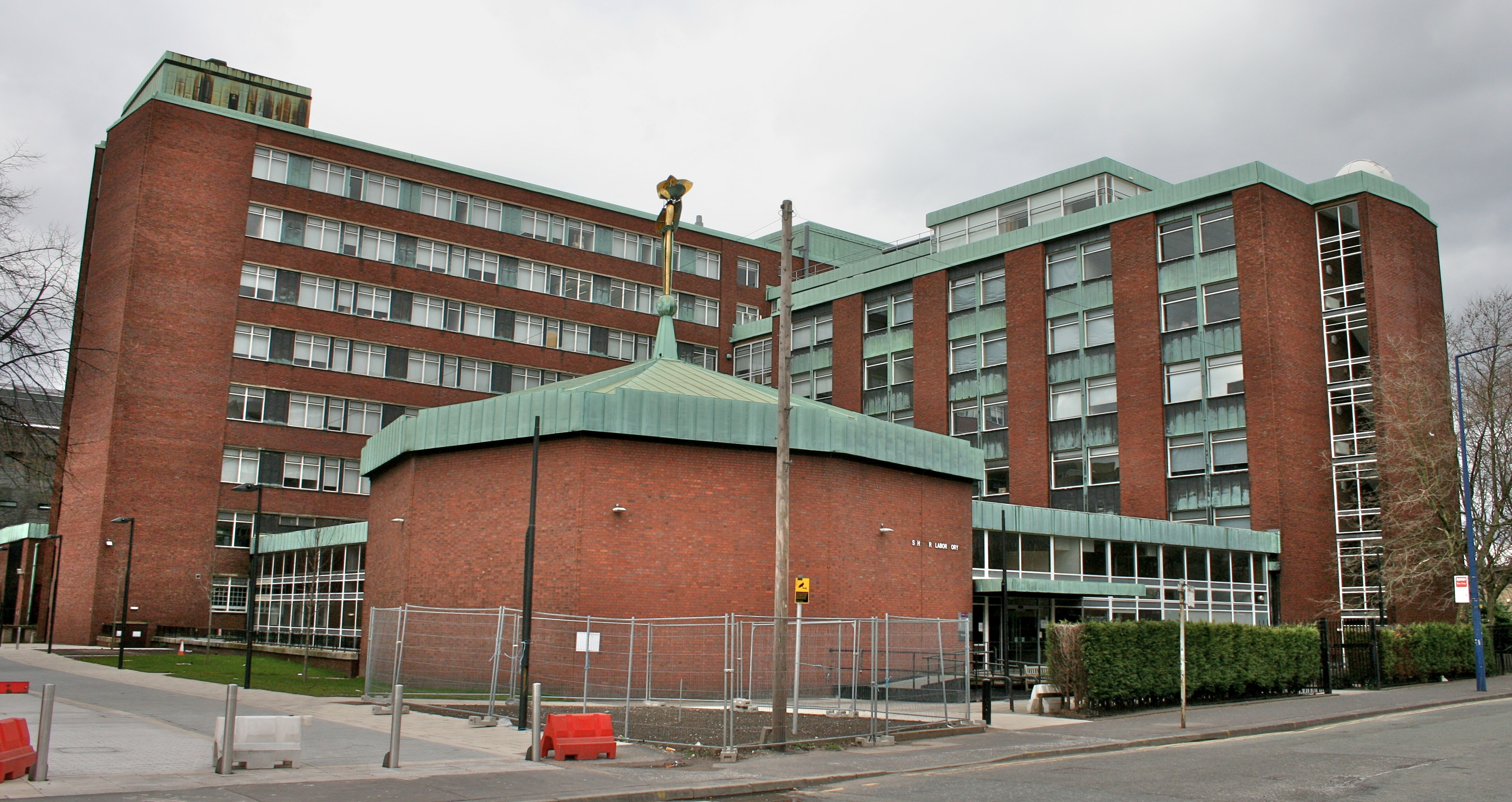
- The Schuster Laboratory, home to the Department of Physics and Astronomy
- Former names: School of Physics and Astronomy (2004–2019)
- Affiliations: Faculty of Engineering and Physical Sciences, University of Manchester
- Head of Department: Professor Chris Parkes
- Location: Manchester, United Kingdom
- Website: physics.manchester.ac.uk

The Department of Physics and Astronomy at the University of Manchester is one of the largest and most active physics departments in the UK, taking around 330 new undergraduates each year, and employing around 115 members of academic staff. Including postgraduate students, research fellows, technical and support staff the department comprises nearly 2000 people. In the main Manchester campus the department is based in the Schuster Laboratory on Brunswick street and the nearby Alan Turing Building. The Jodrell Bank Centre for Astrophysics in Cheshire, also comprises part of the department. The Jodrell bank site also houses the international headquarters of the Square Kilometre Array (SKA).

The department also operates the Cockcroft Accelerator Institute at the Daresbury laboratory in collaboration with other universities. It collaborates heavily with CERN, where it also has staff based, and in which it has been a leading university since its founding. It conducts proton-beam therapy cancer treatment research with the Christie hospital, and it also has staff based at Rutherford Appleton Laboratory.

According to the Academic Ranking of World Universities, the department is the 9th best physics department in the world and best in Europe. It is ranked 2nd place in the UK by Grade Point Average (GPA) according to the Research Excellence Framework (REF) in 2021.

The University has a long history of physics dating back to 1874, which includes 12 Nobel Prize laureates, most recently Andre Geim and Konstantin Novoselov who were awarded the Nobel Prize in Physics in 2010 for their discovery of graphene. The department can lay claim to being a foundational birthplace of fields such as Quantum mechanics (Niels Bohr), Nuclear physics (Ernest Rutherford), Particle physics (Patrick_Blackett, Kaon), Radio Astronomy (Jodrell Bank Observatory), and 2D Materials (Graphene).

== Research groups ==
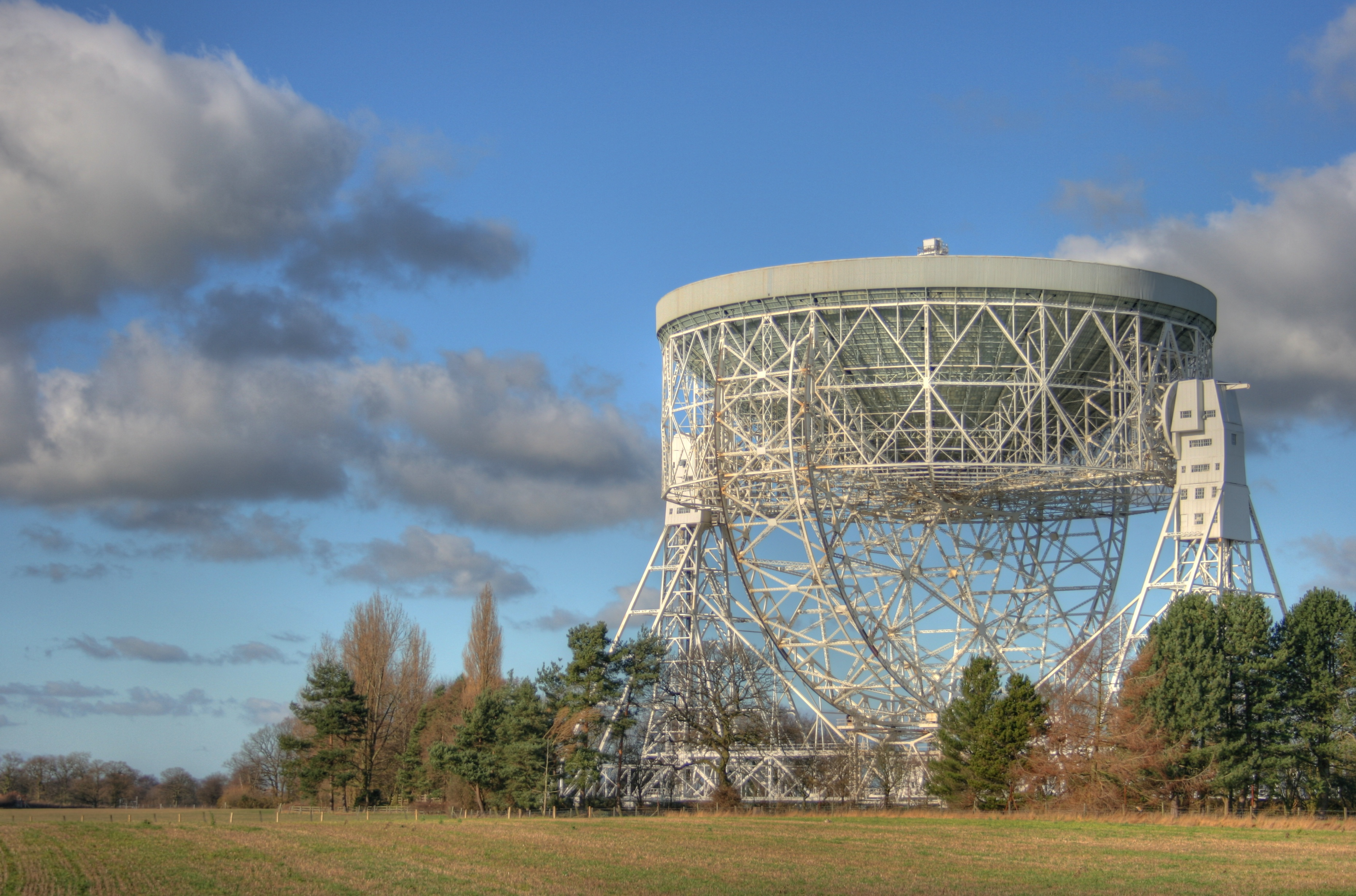
The Lovell Telescope at Jodrell Bank Observatory, part of the Jodrell Bank Centre for Astrophysics in Cheshire.

The Department of Physics and Astronomy research covers a wide-range of topics including:

1. Accelerator Physics
2. Astronomy and Astrophysics
3. Biological Physics
4. Condensed Matter Physics
5. Liquid Crystal Physics
6. Nuclear Physics
7. Particle Physics
8. Quantum Technology
9. Soft Matter Physics
10. Theoretical Physics

Research in the department of Physics is funded by bodies such as the Science and Technology Facilities Council (STFC) the Engineering and Physical Sciences Research Council, the Royal Society, and Horizon Europe.

=== Notable faculty ===
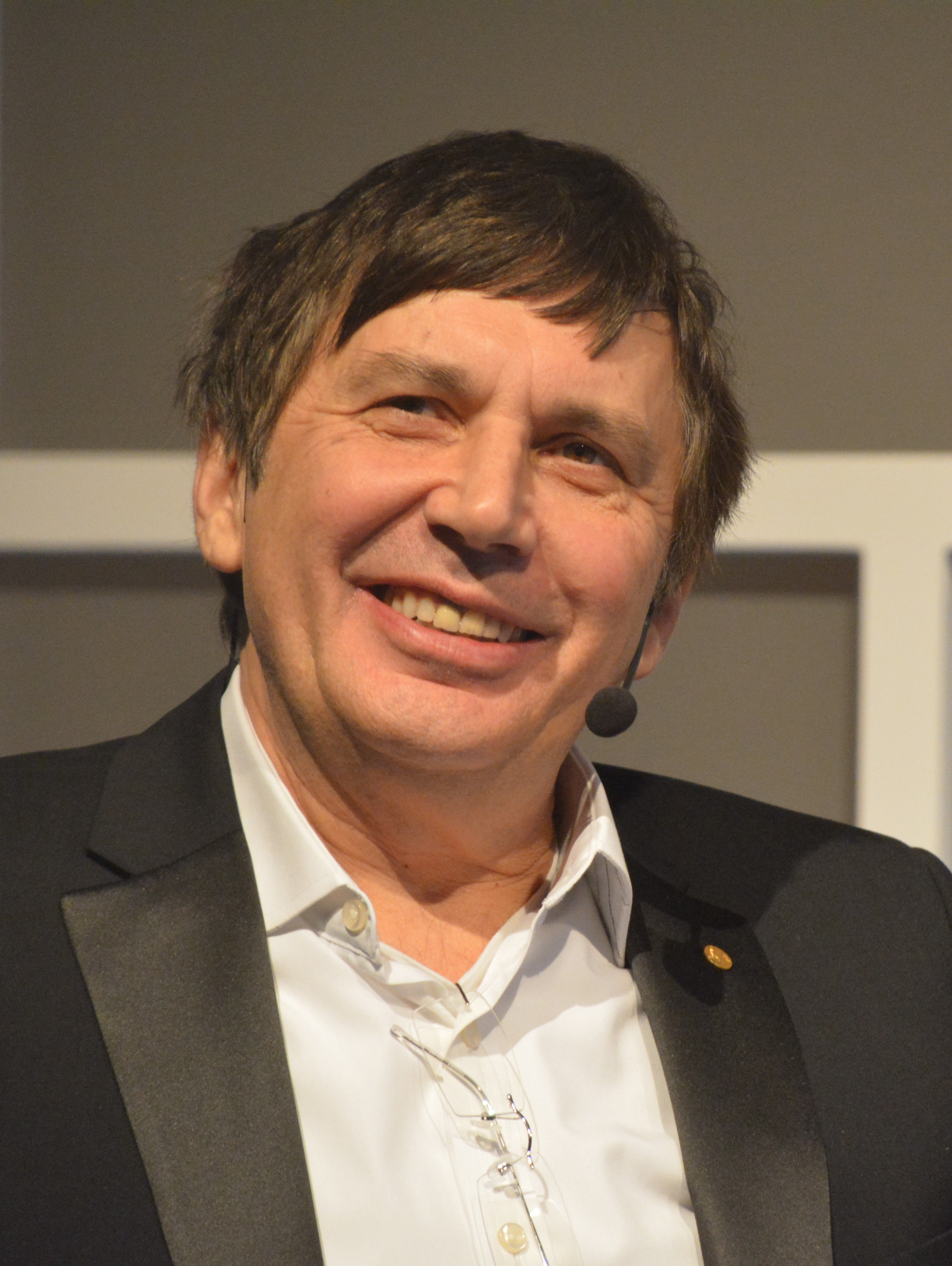
Sir Andre Geim was awarded the Nobel Prize in Physics in 2010 for the discovery of graphene with Konstantin Novoselov

Renowned faculty and active emeritus faculty include:

- Teresa Anderson Professor of Physics and co-founder of the Bluedot Festival
- Philippa Browning Emeritus Professor Astrophysics
- Brian Cox, Professor of Particle Physics, working on the ATLAS experiment at the Large Hadron Collider
- Philip Diamond, Emeritus, Professor of Photon Physics and former Director General of the Square Kilometre Array (SKA)
- Wendy Flavell, Emeritus, Former Vice Dean for Research and a Professor of Surface Physics
- Jeffrey Forshaw FRS, Professor of Particle Physics and co-author of The Quantum Universe
- Sean Freeman, Professor of Nuclear Physics and former leader of the ISOLDE nuclear physics at CERN.
- Mike Garett FRS, Professor of Astrophysics and former director of Jodrell Bank.
- Sir Andre Geim FRS, Regius Professor & Royal Society Research Professor and Nobel Laureate
- Mark Lancaster FRS, Professor of particle physics and former leader of the Muon g-2 collaboration at Fermilab, which received the Breakthrough Prize in Fundamental Physics
- Michael Moore FRS, Emeritus Professor of Theoretical Physics
- Andrew Lyne FRS, Emeritus Professor and co-discoverer of the binary pulsar
- Robin Marshall FRS, Emeritus Professor of Physics and Biology
- Sir Konstantin Novoselov FRS, Langworthy Professor of Physics and Nobel Laureate
- Tim O'Brien, Professor of Astrophysics
- Chris Parkes FRS, Professor of Particle Physics and former leader of the LHCb Collaboration at CERN, which received the Breakthrough Prize in Fundamental Physics.
- Terry Wyatt FRS, Professor of Particle Physics and former leader of the D0 Collaboration at Fermilab

=== Notable alumni and former staff ===
- Sarah Bridle, Professor of Food, Climate and Society at the University of York
- Neil Burgess, University College London
- Tamsin Edwards, King's College London
- Yvonne Elsworth, University of Birmingham
- Danielle George, Professor of Radiofrequency Engineering

== History ==
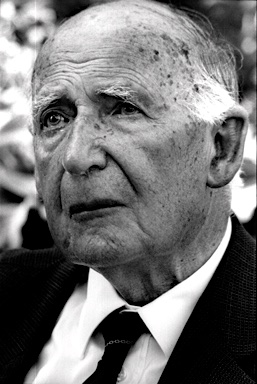
Sir Bernard Lovell (1913–2012): founder of the Jodrell Bank Observatory.

The department has origins dating back to 1874 when Balfour Stewart was appointed the first Langworthy Professor of Physics at Owens College, Manchester. Stewart was the first to identify an electrified atmospheric layer (now known as the ionosphere) which could distort the Earth's magnetic field. The theory of the ionosphere was postulated by Carl Friedrich Gauss in 1839, Stewart published the first experimental confirmation of the theory in 1878. Since then, the department has hosted many award-winning scientists including:

- Hans Bethe, awarded the Nobel Prize in Physics in 1967
- Patrick Blackett, Baron Blackett, awarded the Nobel Prize in Physics in 1948
- Niels Bohr, awarded the Nobel Prize in Physics in 1922
- Sir William Lawrence Bragg, discovered Bragg's law and awarded the Nobel Prize in Physics in 1915
- Sir James Chadwick, awarded the Nobel Prize in Physics in 1935
- Sir John Cockcroft, awarded the Nobel Prize in Physics in 1951
- Rod Davies, Professor of Radio Astronomy
- Richard Davis, Professor of Astrophysics
- Samuel Devons,
- Brian Flowers, Baron Flowers,
- Sir Francis Graham-Smith, Astronomer Royal from 1982 to 1990
- Henry Hall, who built the first dilution refrigerator
- Sir Bernard Lovell, creator of the Lovell Telescope at the Jodrell Bank Observatory
- Henry Moseley, creator of Moseley's law
- Nevill Francis Mott, awarded the Nobel Prize in Physics in 1977
- Ernest Rutherford, awarded the Nobel Prize in Chemistry in 1908 for splitting the atom
- Sir Arthur Schuster,
- Balfour Stewart, first Langworthy Professor of Physics
- Sir Joseph John "J. J." Thomson, studied Physics at Owens College, Manchester aged 14, went on to run the Cavendish Laboratory in Cambridge and was awarded the 1906 Nobel Prize in Physics.

In 2004, the two separate departments of Physics at the Victoria University of Manchester and the University of Manchester Institute of Science and Technology (UMIST) were merged to form the current Department of Physics and Astronomy at the University of Manchester. The department was known as the School of Physics and Astronomy until a 2019 reshuffle.
