= The Quantum Universe =

2011 book by Brian Cox

The Quantum Universe: Everything That Can Happen Does Happen
- first edition
- Author: Brian Cox, Jeff Forshaw
- Language: English
- Subject: Physics, quantum mechanics
- Genre: Non-fiction
- Publisher: Allen Lane
- Publication date: 29 October 2011
- Publication place: United Kingdom
- Media type: Print (hardcover)
- Pages: 272 pp.
- ISBN: 978-1846144325
- Preceded by: Wonders of the Universe
- Followed by: Wonders of Life

The Quantum Universe: Everything That Can Happen Does Happen is a 2011 book by the theoretical physicists Brian Cox and Jeff Forshaw.

== Overview ==
The book aims to provide an explanation of quantum mechanics and its impact on the modern world that is accessible to a general reader. The authors say that "our goal in writing this book is to demystify quantum theory". Starting with the concepts of wave–particle duality and a non-technical description of the path integral formulation of quantum mechanics, the book explains the uncertainty principle, energy levels in atoms, the physics of semi-conductors and transistors, the Feynman diagram, the Pauli exclusion principle, and the Standard Model of particle physics. A more mathematical Epilogue discusses the role of quantum mechanics in models of stellar evolution, and derives the Chandrasekhar limit for the maximum mass of a stable white dwarf star.

== Reception ==
The Guardian admiringly compares the authors' writing with physicist and science popularizer Richard Feynman's works: "The narration is much more loose and chatty even than Feynman's famously approachable prose, though the distinction makes good sense. Feynman delivered his popularisations in an era that had never seen an internet browser, let alone YouTube videos, blogs or tweets. The conversational tone of Cox and Forshaw fits as easily in our time as Feynman's did in his." Overall, the reviewer says, "readers will enjoy this engaging, ambitious and creative tour of our quantum universe."

Kirkus Reviews says, "Writers often explain these [quantum laws] in relentlessly nontechnical language that converts them into a magic show," but while Cox and Forshaw "show real imagination, they are dealing with profoundly challenging subjects, and readers who do not pay close attention will find themselves reduced to enjoying the traditional magic show." The reviewer calls the book an "ambitious explanation of the vast quantum universe aimed at readers willing to work." Similarly, The Space Review writes, "Their approach is to lead the reader through the science of quantum physics, with a little bit of history and other background intermixed, trying to find a balance of clearly explaining these subjects without getting too simplistic." The reviewer says "For those willing to put in a fair amount of attention and thought, and are not intimidated by the sight of an equation or two," the work is successful. For the popular science fan, quantum physics is "maddening," but "after reading this book, it may seem a little less strange."

A review in The New York Journal of Books notes that the authors "do not dwell on the history of the subject, merely mentioning the contributions of Schroedinger, Bohr, Dirac, Einstein," and other physicists who laid the foundations. The reviewer concludes, "The Quantum Universe may not demystify quantum theory, but it does give the reader an idea of the size of the mountain the book is trying to climb — and a toe-hold or two to help get us started on our own ascent."

Kara Reviews had a mixed opinion, saying that "Cox and Forshaw do a pretty good job":

To their credit, although they refer to calculus and other higher math, the actual math they show is comprehensible to someone who took high school physics. Nevertheless, if you do skip the math ... well, you'll end up reading very little of what's already a short book. I fear The Quantum Universe suffers from trying to have its cake and eat it as well. Cox and Forshaw are so invested in not having to explain complex-based trigonometry to a lay audience that they manage to invent an analogy even more complicated than this math! ... It's a shame, because in between the confusing analogies and inexorable unravelling, The Quantum Universe treats the subject of quantum mechanics with wit and a graceful touch. Cox and Forshaw write well together. There is a sense of humour to the descriptions, particularly when they take a stab at the intelligence of drum players (since Cox used to be in a rock band). Despite making assurances about being able to skip the math, they never patronize the reader. This could have been a brilliant introduction to quantum mechanics for the layperson. As it is, while it's not a total trainwreck, I wouldn't recommend starting here either."

== See also ==
- Quantum field
- Quantum mechanics
