= Solar System (TV series) =

2024 BBC documentaries with Brian Cox

- Genre: Documentary
- Directed by: Ben Wilson
- Presented by: Brian Cox (UK version)
- Narrated by: Mercer Boffey (U.S. version)
- Composers: Anže Rozman; Camilo Forero
- Country of origin: United Kingdom
- Original language: English
- No. of seasons: 1
- No. of episodes: 5

Production
- Executive producers: Andrew Cohen; Gideon Bradshaw
- Producers: Suzy Boyles; Alice Jones
- Production companies: BBC Studios; with Nova; co-produced by PBS

Original release
- Network: BBC Two; PBS
- Release: 7 October – 4 November 2024

Related
- The Planets (2019 BBC series); Wonders of the Solar System; Nova

Solar System is a 2024 documentary TV miniseries produced by the BBC and narrated by Brian Cox. The first episode was shown on BBC Two on 7 October 2024, with the remaining four episodes made available on BBC iPlayer on the same date. It follows Cox's previous series Wonders of the Solar System, shown in 2010, and The Planets, shown in 2019. The programme is focused on explaining scientific knowledge of the Solar System in simple terms, using a combination of Earth-based experiments, CGI, and real footage.

== Episodes ==
No.	Title	US title	Directed by	Original release date	UK viewers (millions)
1	"Volcano Worlds"	Volcano Worlds	Ben Wilson	7 October 2024	2.70
Professor Brian Cox journeys to the volcano worlds of the Solar System and explore alien landscapes bursting with fire and ice. There are planets and moons covered in volcanoes, with eruptions so violent they reach into space. Understanding what makes these worlds active is critical in the search for life beyond Earth.
2	"Dark Worlds"	Wandering Worlds	Laura Mulholland	14 October 2024	N/A
Professor Brian Cox explores the Solar System’s hidden realms, between and beyond the planets, where countless worlds lie shrouded in darkness.
3	"Storm Worlds"	Storm Worlds	Fleur Bone	21 October 2024	N/A
Professor Brian Cox goes on a journey to the storm worlds of the Solar System and explores the weird weather that plays out in the atmospheres of distant planets and moons.
4	"Ice Worlds"	Icy Worlds	Nat Sharman	28 October 2024	N/A
Professor Brian Cox explores the Solar System’s frozen worlds. He meets the dwarf planet where mountains of solid ice float across the surface, the black and white moon painted with frost, and a world illuminated by a strange form of ice.
5	"Strange Worlds"	Strange Worlds	Ben Wilson	4 November 2024	N/A
Professor Brian Cox explores the Solar System’s weirdest worlds – the misfits and oddballs with freakish shapes and sizes.
