= Why Does E=mc²? =

Book by Brian Cox

- First edition
- Author: Brian Cox, Jeff Forshaw
- Language: English
- Subject: Physics, theory of relativity
- Genre: Non-fiction
- Publisher: Da Capo Press
- Publication date: July 14, 2009
- Publication place: United States
- Media type: Print (hardcover)
- Pages: 264 pp.
- ISBN: 978-0306818769
- Followed by: Wonders of the Solar System

Why Does E=mc²? (And Why Should We Care?) is a 2009 book by the theoretical physicists Brian Cox and Jeff Forshaw. This was the first full-scale book from Professors Cox and Forshaw.

== Overview ==
The book aims to provide an explanation of the theory of relativity that is accessible to a general reader. The authors tell the history of Albert Einstein's equation, E=mc², and explain what it stands for.
