= Wonders of Life (book) =

Book by Brian Cox

- First edition
- Author: Brian Cox
- Language: English
- Subject: Life, popular science
- Genre: Non-fiction
- Publisher: Harper Design
- Publication date: 2013
- Pages: 288 pp.
- ISBN: 9780062241788
- Preceded by: The Quantum Universe
- Followed by: Human Universe

Wonders of Life: Exploring the Most Extraordinary Phenomenon in the Universe is a 2013 book by the theoretical physicists Brian Cox and Andrew Cohen.

== Overview ==
The book aims to explore the mystery of where life came from and what it is, and is explained in a way that is accessible to a general reader. The book is based on a series with the same name Wonders of Life.
