= Michael Garrett =

Michael Garrett may refer to:

== Sports ==
- Mick Garrett (born 1937), Irish Gaelic footballer
- Mike Garrett (born 1944), American football player
- Mike Garrett (punter) (born 1957), American football player

== Others ==
- Michael Garrett (astronomer) (born 1964), General Director of the Dutch astronomy research foundation ASTRON
- Michael Garrett (composer) (born 1944), British composer
- Michael X. Garrett (born 1961), U.S. Army general
- Michael Garrett (politician) (born c. 1985), member of the North Carolina State Senate
