= Brian Cox (physicist) =

English physicist and musician (born 1968)

Brian Cox CBE FRS FInstP Hon.FRSB Hon.FRAM
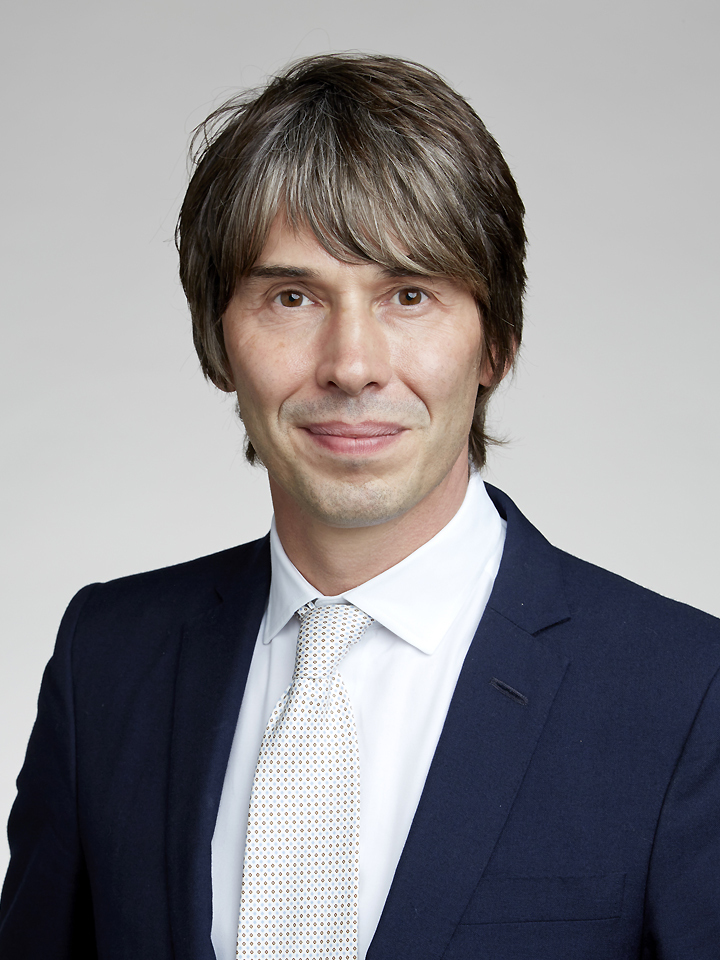
- Cox in 2016
- Born: Brian Edward Cox; 3 March 1968 (age 58); Oldham, England
- Education: University of Manchester (BSc, PhD)
- Occupations: Physicist, musician
- Known for: Why Does E=mc^{2}?; The Quantum Universe; Wonders of Life; Wonders of the Universe; Wonders of the Solar System; The Planets; Human Universe; Stargazing Live
- Spouse: Gia Milinovich (m. 2003)
- Children: 1
- Awards: Kelvin Prize (2010); Michael Faraday Prize (2012); University Research Fellow (2005)
- Scientific career
- Fields: Particle physics
- Workplaces: University of Manchester; CERN; DESY
- Thesis: Double diffraction dissociation at large momentum transfer (1998)
- Doctoral advisor: Robin Marshall
- Doctoral students: Tamsin Edwards
- Musical career
- Instrument: Keyboards
- Formerly of: Dare, D Ream
- Website: apolloschildren.com

Brian Edward Cox (born 3 March 1968) is an English physicist and musician. He is a professor of particle physics in the Department of Physics and Astronomy at the University of Manchester and the Royal Society professor for public engagement in science. He is best known to the public as the presenter of science programmes, especially BBC Radio 4's The Infinite Monkey Cage and the Wonders of... series and for popular science books, including Why Does E=mc^{2}? (2009) and The Quantum Universe (2011).

David Attenborough described Cox as the natural successor for the BBC's scientific programming. Before his academic career, he was a keyboard player for the rock band Dare, as well as a live and session keyboardist for the pop group D:Ream.

== Early life and education ==
Cox was born on 3 March 1968 in the Royal Oldham Hospital, later living in nearby Chadderton from 1971. He has a younger sister. His parents worked for Yorkshire Bank, his mother as a cashier and his father as a middle-manager in the same branch. He recalls a happy childhood in Oldham that included pursuits such as dance, gymnastics, and plane and bus spotting. He attended the private Hulme Grammar School in Oldham from 1979 to 1986.

Cox has stated in many interviews and in an episode of Wonders of the Universe that when he was 12, the book Cosmos by Carl Sagan was a key factor in inspiring him to become a physicist. He said on The Jonathan Ross Show that he performed poorly on his maths A-level exam: "I got a D ... I was really not very good ... I found out you need to practise."

=== Music ===
In the 1980s and early 1990s, Cox was a keyboard player with the rock band Dare. Dare released two studio albums with Cox – Out of the Silence in 1988 and Blood from Stone in 1991. He subsequently became a live and session keyboardist for the pop group D:Ream. Cox wrote the foreword of the official Orchestral Manoeuvres in the Dark biography, OMD: Pretending to See the Future (2018), having been an "obsessive" fan of the band in his youth. He said of their songs, "They shaped my character and inspired me to make music."

Cox continues to perform sporadically. In 2015, he appeared as a guest keyboardist during a performance of the song "Your Silent Face" by New Order. He played a live rendition of OMD's "Enola Gay", alongside frontman Andy McCluskey, in 2022. On 29 June 2024, Cox appeared at the Glastonbury Festival with D:Ream to perform "Things Can Only Get Better".

=== Higher education ===
Cox studied physics at the University of Manchester during his music career. In 1995, he earned a Bachelor of Science degree with first-class honours in physics. After D:Ream disbanded in 1997, he completed his Doctor of Philosophy degree in high-energy particle physics at the University of Manchester in 1998. His thesis, Double Diffraction Dissociation at Large Momentum Transfer, was supervised by Robin Marshall and based on research he did on the H1 experiment at the Hadron Elektron Ring Anlage (HERA) particle accelerator at the DESY laboratory in Hamburg, Germany.

== Career and research ==
Cox is a particle physicist at the University of Manchester. He worked on the ATLAS experiment at the Large Hadron Collider (LHC) at CERN, near Geneva, Switzerland. He previously held a Royal Society University Research Fellowship and a Particle Physics and Astronomy Research Council (PPARC) advanced research fellowship.

Cox has co-written several books on physics including Why does E=mc^{2}? and The Quantum Universe, both with Jeff Forshaw. He has supervised or co-supervised several PhD students to completion including Tamsin Edwards.

=== Broadcasting ===
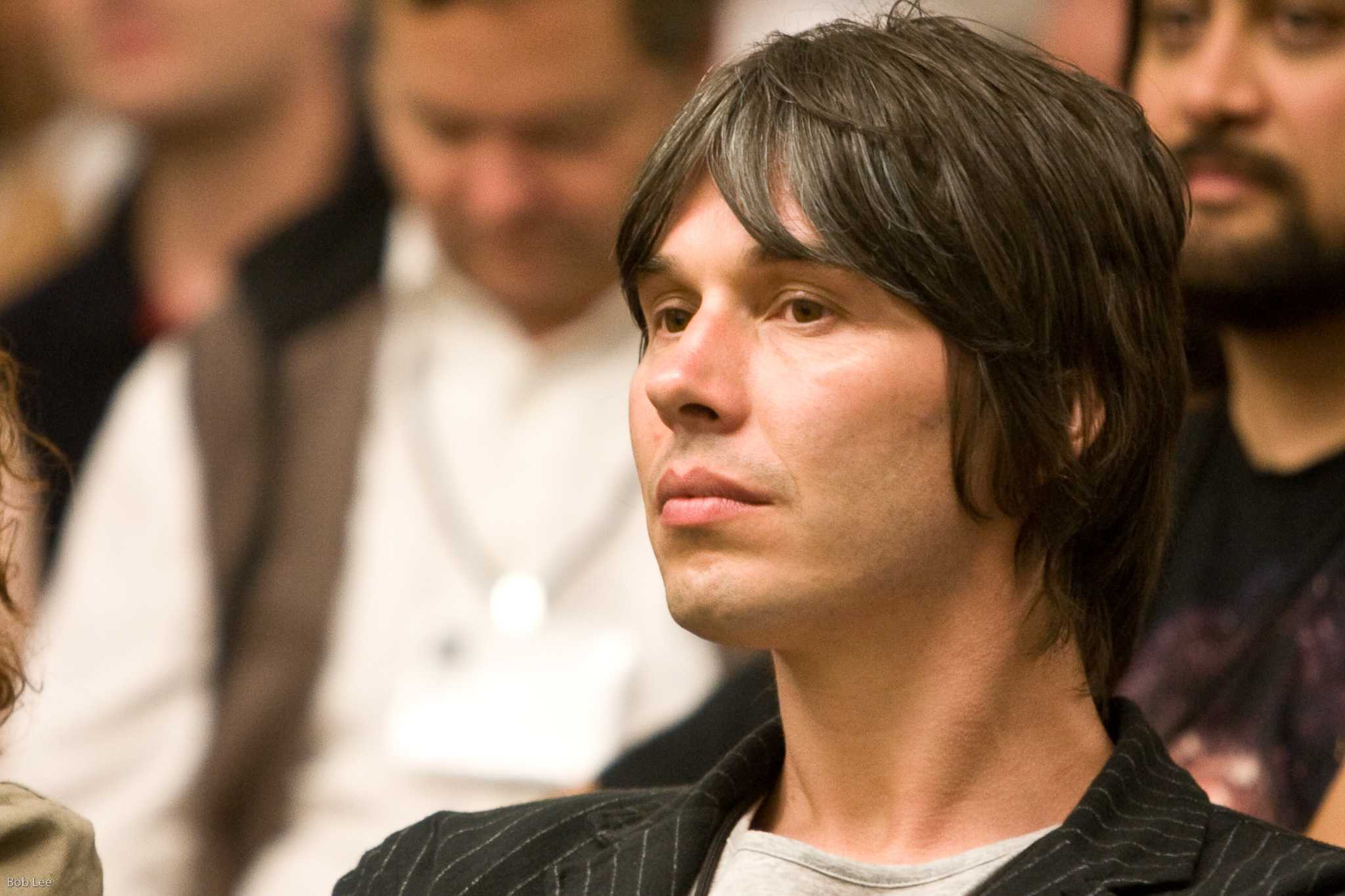
Cox at Science Foo Camp in 2008

Cox has appeared in many science programmes for BBC radio and television, including In Einstein's Shadow, the BBC Horizon series, ("The Six Billion Dollar Experiment", "What on Earth is Wrong with Gravity?", "Do You Know What Time It Is?", and "Can we Make a Star on Earth?") and as a voice-over for the BBC's Bitesize revision programmes. He presented the five-part BBC Two television series Wonders of the Solar System in early 2010 and a follow-up four-part series, Wonders of the Universe, which began on 6 March 2011. Wonders of Life, which he describes as "a physicist's take on life/natural history", was broadcast in 2013. He co-presents Space Hoppers and has also featured in Dani's House on CBBC.

Cox also presented a three-part BBC series called Science Britannica which sees him explore the contribution of British scientists over the last 350 years, as well as the relationship between British science and the public perception thereof.

BBC Two commissioned Cox to copresent Stargazing Live, a three-day live astronomy series in January 2011 – co-presented with comedian Dara Ó Briain and featuring chat show host Jonathan Ross – linked to events across the United Kingdom. A second and a third series featuring a variety of guests ran in January 2012 and January 2013.

Since November 2009, Cox has co-presented a BBC Radio 4 "comedy science magazine programme", The Infinite Monkey Cage, with comedian Robin Ince. Guests have included comedians Tim Minchin, Alexei Sayle, Dara Ó Briain, and scientists including Alice Roberts of the BBC show The Incredible Human Journey, Callum Roberts, a chief scientific advisor for Blue Planet II, and astrophysicist Neil deGrasse Tyson. Cox also appeared in Ince's Nine Lessons and Carols for Godless People. He was a regular contributor to the BBC 6 Music Breakfast Show (and the Afternoon Show since 2019) with Shaun Keaveny, with a weekly feature, and an annual Christmas special with Keaveny and Brian Eno. He appeared on 24 July 2009 episode of Robert Llewellyn's CarPool podcast series.

Cox has also appeared numerous times at TED, giving talks on the LHC and particle physics. In 2009 he appeared in People magazine's Sexiest Men Alive. In 2010, he was featured in The Case for Mars by Symphony of Science. In November 2010 he made a promotional appearance in the Covent Garden Apple Store, talking about his new e-book set to accompany his new television series as well as answering audience questions.

Cox gave the Royal Television Society's 2010 Huw Wheldon Memorial Lecture on "Science, a Challenge to TV Orthodoxy", in which he examined problems in media coverage of science and news about science. It was subsequently broadcast on BBC Two. On 4 March, a talk entitled "Frankenstein's Science" at the National Theatre featured Cox in discussion with biographer Richard Holmes on Mary Shelley's exploration of humanity's desire to bring life to an inanimate object and whether the notion is possible, in both the 19th century and today.

On 6 March 2011, Cox appeared as a guest at Patrick Moore's 700th episode anniversary of The Sky at Night. He has said that he is a lifelong fan of the programme, and that it helped inspire him to become a physicist. On 10 March 2011, he gave the Ninth Douglas Adams Memorial Lecture.

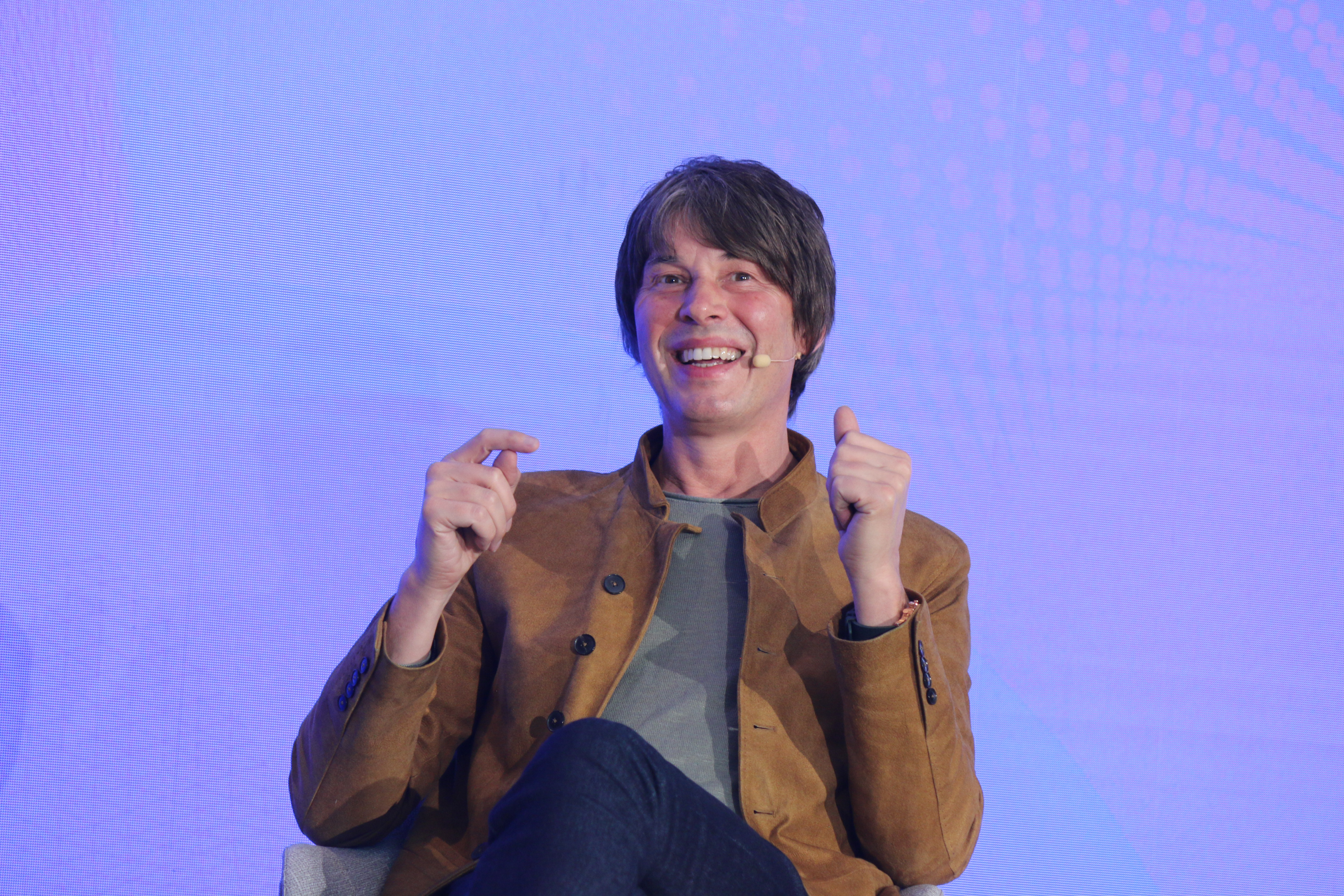
Cox in 2025 at The Economist Technology for Change Asia

Cox was the science advisor for the science fiction film Sunshine. On the DVD release, he provides an audio commentary where he discusses scientific accuracies (and inaccuracies) depicted in the film. He also was featured on the Discovery Channel special Megaworld: Switzerland. In 2013, he presented another series of Wonders of Life.

On 14 November 2013, BBC Two broadcast The Science of Doctor Who in celebration of Doctor Who's 50th anniversary, in which Cox tackles the mysteries of time travel. The lecture was recorded at the Royal Institution Faraday Lecture Theatre. The BBC subsequently broadcast Human Universe and Forces of Nature also presented by Cox.

A longtime fan of the Monty Python comedy troupe, in July 2014 Cox appeared on stage on the final night of their 10-date live show, Monty Python Live (Mostly). He also appears on the documentary telefilm Monty Python: The Meaning of Live.

In 2017, Cox appeared in the children's television programme Postman Pat, voicing space expert Professor Ryan Farrow.

=== Filmography ===
| Year | Title | Role | Notes |
|---|---|---|---|
| 2005–2009 | Horizon | Himself/presenter | Episodes: Einstein's Equation of Life and Death (2005); Einstein's Unfinished Symphony (2005); The Six Billion Dollar Experiment (2007); What on Earth is Wrong with Gravity? (2008); Do You Know What Time It Is? (2008); Can we Make a Star on Earth? (2009) |
| 2008 | The Big Bang Machine | Presenter | |
| 2010 | Wonders of the Solar System | Presenter | |
| 2010 | Dani's House | Himself | |
| 2010 | Would I Lie to You? | Panellist | |
| 2011 | Wonders of the Universe | Presenter | |
| 2011 | A Night with the Stars | Presenter | |
| 2011 | The One Show | Guest | |
| 2011 | The Sky at Night | Guest | 700th episode |
| 2011 | The Graham Norton Show | Guest | Series 8, Episode 16 |
| 2011 | The Horizon Guide: Moon | Presenter | |
| 2011–2012 | QI | Panellist | Episodes: Series I, Episode 7 "Incomprehensible" (broadcast 21 October 2011); Series J, Episode 12 "Justice" (broadcast 7 December 2012) |
| 2011–2017, 2019 | Stargazing Live | Co-presenter | All 6 episodes |
| 2012 | The Jonathan Ross Show | Guest | |
| 2012 | Doctor Who | Himself (cameo) | "The Power of Three" |
| 2013 | Wonders of Life | Presenter | |
| 2013 | Science Britannica | Presenter | September 2013, BBC Two |
| 2013 | Conan | Guest | Episode 437 |
| 2013 | The Science of Doctor Who | Presenter | BBC Two |
| 2013 | In Search of Science | Presenter | Episodes: Method and Madness; Frankenstein's Monster; Money |
| 2014 | CBeebies Bedtime Stories | Himself | Episode: "The Way Back Home" |
| 2014 | Monty Python Live | Himself | |
| 2014 | Human Universe | Presenter | BBC Two |
| 2014 | Space, Time & Videotape | Presenter | BBC Four |
| 2015 | Absolutely Anything | Himself (cameo) | |
| 2016 | Forces of Nature | Presenter | BBC One |
| 2016 | The Entire Universe | Presenter | BBC Two |
| 2016 | Charlie Brooker's Weekly Wipe | Himself | 2016 Wipe (BBC Two) |
| 2017 | Life of a Universe | Presenter | ABC |
| 2017 | John Bishop: In Conversation With... | Himself (Series 3 Episode 10) | W |
| 2017 | Postman Pat | Professor Ryan Farrow (voice) | Episode: "Postman Pat and the Space Suit" (CBeebies) |
| 2017 | The 21st Century Race for Space | Presenter | BBC Two |
| 2019 | The Planets | Presenter | BBC Two |
| 2021 | Brian Cox's Adventures in Space and Time | Presenter | BBC Two |
| 2021 | Universe | Presenter | BBC Two |
| 2022 | Mandy | Himself | Series 2, Episode 6 "The Curse of Mandy Carter" (BBC Two) |
| 2022 | Brian Cox: Seven Days on Mars | Presenter | BBC Two |
| 2023 | A Symphonic Odyssey with Professor Brian Cox | Presenter | Released by the Australian Broadcasting Corporation on 2 January 2024. |
| 2024 | Ant & Dec's Saturday Night Takeaway | Himself | Series 20 Episode 7 |
| 2024 | Solar System | Presenter | BBC Two series |
| 2024 | Cunk on Life | Himself | BBC and Netflix production |

=== Discography ===
- Dare – Out of the Silence (1988)
- Dare – Blood from Stone (1991)
- D:Ream – D:Ream on Volume 1 (1993)
- Ten - The Name of the Rose (1996)
- D:Ream – In Memory Of... (2011)

=== Bibliography ===
- Why Does E=mc^{2}? (And Why Should We Care?) (with Jeff Forshaw) (2009)
- Wonders of the Solar System (with Andrew Cohen) (2010)
- Wonders of the Universe (with Andrew Cohen) (2011)
- The Quantum Universe (And Why Anything That Can Happen, Does) with Jeff Forshaw (2011)
- Wonders of Life: Exploring the Most Extraordinary Phenomenon in the Universe (with Andrew Cohen) (2013)
- Human Universe (with Andrew Cohen) (2014)
- Forces of Nature (with Andrew Cohen) (2016)
- Universal: A Guide to the Cosmos (with Jeff Forshaw) (2016)
- Black Holes: The Key to Understanding the Universe (with Jeff Forshaw) (2022)

=== Awards and honours ===
Cox has received many awards for his efforts to popularize science. In 2002 he was elected an International Fellow of The Explorers Club and in 2006 he received the British Association's Lord Kelvin Award for this work. He held a prestigious Royal Society University Research Fellowship (an early-career Research Fellowship scheme) from 2006 to 2013. A frequent lecturer, he was keynote speaker at the Australian Science Festival in 2006, and in 2010 won the Institute of Physics Kelvin Medal and Prize for his work in communicating the appeal and excitement of physics to the general public.

He was appointed Officer of the Order of the British Empire (OBE) in the 2010 Birthday Honours for services to science and promoted to Commander of the same Order (CBE) in the 2020 Birthday Honours for services to the promotion of science.

On 15 March 2011, he won Best Presenter and Best Science/Natural History programme by the Royal Television Society for Wonders of the Universe. On 25 March 2011, he won twice at the Broadcasting Press Guild Awards for 'Best Performer' in a non-acting role, while Wonders of the Solar System was named best documentary series of 2010.

In July 2012, Cox was conferred the honorary award of Doctor of the University (Hon DUniv) from the University of Huddersfield, presented by Patrick Stewart. Later that year, he was awarded the Institute of Physics President's medal by Peter Knight, following which he gave a speech on the value of education in science and the need to invest more in future generations of scientists. On 5 October 2012, Cox was awarded the honorary degree of Doctor of the University (DUniv) by the Open University for his "Exceptional contribution to Education and Culture". In 2012 he also was awarded the Michael Faraday Prize of the Royal Society "for his excellent work in science communication." He was elected a Fellow of the Royal Society (FRS) in 2016. In 2022, he was awarded the Hawking Fellowship by the Cambridge Union in the University of Cambridge.

In 2025, the United Nations Office for Outer Space Affairs (UNOOSA) named Cox its Champion for Space.

== Political views ==
Cox has voiced his concerns about Brexit, saying he feels it is a "weakening of our interaction with our neighbouring countries" and that "it cannot be the right trajectory". On 23 June 2018, the People's Vote march was held in London to mark the second anniversary of the referendum to leave the European Union. Cox tweeted, "if [a people's vote were] held on known exit terms and leave commanded majority, I'd back it as settled, informed decision. That's my argument for having one".

== Personal life ==
In 2003, Cox married American television presenter and writer Gia Milinovich in Duluth, Minnesota. They have a son, born in 2009, and Milinovich has a son from a previous relationship. As of 2012, they live in Battersea, London.

Despite lacking a belief in deities, Cox has rejected the label "atheist" and has instead preferred to describe himself as having "no personal faith". In 2009, he contributed to the charity book The Atheist's Guide to Christmas. He is a humanist, and is a Distinguished Supporter of Humanists UK. In June 2019, Cox explained that he cannot be sure there is no God and that science cannot answer every question.

Cox is a supporter of the football club Oldham Athletic and has held a season ticket at the club.
