= Michael Moore (physicist) =

British scientist and academic

Michael Moore FRS
- Born: Michael Arthur Moore; 1943 (age 82–83)
- Education: Huddersfield New College
- Alma mater: University of Oxford
- Scientific career
- Fields: Theoretical physics
- Workplaces: University of Manchester; University of Illinois at Urbana–Champaign; University of Oxford; University of Sussex
- Thesis: Some problems in the theory of many-body systems (1967)
- Doctoral advisor: W. E. Parry
- Doctoral students: Neil Burgess
- Website: www.research.manchester.ac.uk/portal/m.a.moore.html

Michael Arthur Moore (born 1943) FRS is a British physicist and Emeritus Professor of theoretical physics in the School of Physics and Astronomy at the University of Manchester where he has worked since 1976.

Moore was elected a Fellow of the Royal Society (FRS) in 1989.

== Early life and education ==
Moore was born on 8 October 1943, the son of John Moore and Barbara Atkinson. He was educated at Huddersfield New College and Oriel College, Oxford. Whilst at Oxford he was awarded a Doctor of Philosophy degree in 1967 for research on Many-body theory supervised by W. E. Parry.

== Research and career ==
After his PhD he earned at the University of Illinois at Urbana–Champaign. Between 1969 and 1971, he was a research fellow at Magdalen College, Oxford. Between 1971 and 1976, he was a lecturer in physics at the University of Sussex.

Moore has published many papers in statistical physics covering a wide range of topics. His early research was on the application of scaling theories to magnetic spin systems and superfluidity, and contained a series of useful results on critical indices. He then applied renormalisation group ideas to polymer solutions and clarified the relationship of this approach to previous theories; a particularly interesting result concerned the retrieval of the Flory index under approximation schemes. After some work on critical behaviour on surfaces, he joined the (then) new spin glass field, and in collaboration with Alan Bray wrote a series of important papers both on replica symmetry breaking in these systems and on their properties as revealed by computer simulation. In particular, he is associated with the droplet scaling theory of the spin glass state. In recent years, Michael has extended this work to structural glasses.
