= Tamsin Edwards =

British climate scientist

- Born: Tamsin L. Edwards
- Education: St Margaret's School, Exeter; University of Manchester (BSc, PhD)
- Known for: Climate science Science communication
- Father: Michael Edwards
- Scientific career
- Workplaces: University of Bristol; Open University; King's College London
- Thesis: Diffractively produced Z bosons in the muon decay channel in pp collisions at √s=1.96 TeV, and the measurement of the efficiency of the DØ Run II Luminosity Monitor (2006)
- Doctoral advisor: Brian Cox
- Website: www.kcl.ac.uk/people/tamsin-edwards

Tamsin Edwards is a British climate scientist and Professor at King's College London. She is a popular science communicator and writes for the Public Library of Science (PLOS).

== Early life and education ==
Edwards became interested in physics after reading A Brief History of Time. The daughter of Michael Edwards, she completed A-Levels in Physics, Chemistry and Maths at St Margaret's School, in Exeter. She studied physics in the School of Physics and Astronomy at the University of Manchester. She completed a PhD in Particle Physics at the University of Manchester under the supervision of Brian Cox. Her thesis investigated the production of Z bosons, detected by their subsequent decay to muons, using data collected at the Tevatron.

== Research and career ==
Edwards joined the Open University as a lecturer, working in the Palaeoenvironmental Change team. She uses computer models to predict and study climate change, with a particular interest in the impact on sea level rise of changes in the Antarctic ice sheet. She studied how a glacier's grounding line (the point at which is separates from a continent's bedrock and floats into the sea) affects the rate of flow of glaciers, and estimated the effects of positive feedback. In 2017, Edwards joined King's College London as a lecturer in geography. She will be a lead author for Chapter 9 (Ocean, cryosphere, and sea level change) of the Sixth Assessment Report of the Intergovernmental Panel on Climate Change.

Edwards writes a popular science blog hosted by the Public Library of Science (PLOS). She has written for The Guardian and contributed chapters to books about climate change. Working with the Met Office, Edwards created educational resources about sea level rise for the 2017 United Nations Climate Change Conference ("COP23").

In 2014, she gave a TEDx talk at CERN, How to Love Uncertainty in Climate Science. After fights between climate scientists and sceptics on Twitter in 2014, Edwards was part of a dinner party discussing how they could calm the debate. The dinner included David Rose and Richard A. Betts, and Edwards was the only woman. In 2015, she was celebrated as one of twenty women "making waves" at the 2015 United Nations Climate Change Conference. She won the 2016 British Science Association Charles Lyell Award for Environmental Sciences. She discussed how computer models can be used to predict ice sheet collapse and how to communicate uncertainty. In 2017, she was profiled in the HuffPost Australia's Breaking The Ice series. She is a speaker at the 2018 Bluedot Festival.

Edwards has acted as a scientific consultant for the BBC. She was a consultant on the BBC's Climate Change by Numbers, which won an American Association for the Advancement of Science award for Science Journalism, and a 2015 award for "Best Presentation of Science in an Environment Issue" from EuroPAWS. She has appeared on BBC Radio 4 and BBC World Service.

She was awarded the 2020 Climate Science Communications Award by the Royal Meteorological Society.

On 28 January 2021, Edwards took part in a panel event of international experts called Climate Change: Why should we care?, organised by the Science Museum Group.

In July 2023, at the Bluedot Festival, Edwards announced she has become a Professor at King’s College.

== Selected publications ==
- Nick, Faezeh M.; Vieli, Andreas; Langer Andersen, Morten; Joughin, Ian; Payne, Anthony J; Edwards, Tamsin L.; Pattyn, Frank; van de Wal, Roderik (2013). "Future sea-level rise from Greenland's main outlet glaciers in a warming climate" (PDF). Nature. 497 (7448): 235–238. Bibcode:2013Natur.497..235N. doi:10.1038/nature12068. PMID 23657350. S2CID 4400824.
- Hawkins, Ed; Edwards, Tamsin; McNeall, Doug (2014). "Pause for thought" (PDF). Nature Climate Change. 4 (3): 154–156. Bibcode:2014NatCC...4..154H. doi:10.1038/nclimate2150. S2CID 85406377.
- Ritz, Catherine; Edwards, Tamsin L.; Durand, Gaël; Payne, Anthony J; Peyaud, Vincent; Hindmarsh, Richard C. A. (2015). "Potential sea-level rise from Antarctic ice-sheet instability constrained by observations" (PDF). Nature. 528 (7580): 115–118. Bibcode:2015Natur.528..115R. doi:10.1038/nature16147. PMID 26580020. S2CID 4462953.
- Edwards, Tamsin (4 December 2017). "Future of the Sea: Current and Future Impacts of Sea Level Rise on the UK". Foresight Future of the Sea project. Government Office for Science.
- Edwards, Tamsin L.; Brandon, Mark A.; Durand, Gaël; Edwards, Neil R.; Golledge, Nicholas R.; Holden, Philip B.; et al. (2019). "Revisiting Antarctic ice loss due to marine ice-cliff instability". Nature. 566 (7742): 58–64. Bibcode:2019Natur.566...58E. doi:10.1038/s41586-019-0901-4. hdl:1983/de5e9847-612f-42fb-97b0-5d7ff43d37b8. PMID 30728522. S2CID 59606547.
