= Wonders of the Solar System =

2010 British television series

- Genre: Documentary series
- Presented by: Professor Brian Cox
- Music by: Sheridan Tongue
- Country of origin: United Kingdom
- Original language: English
- No. of series: 1
- No. of episodes: 5

Production
- Running time: 60 minutes

Original release
- Network: BBC Two; Science Channel
- Release: 7 March – 4 April 2010

Related
- Wonders of the Universe (2011)

Wonders of the Solar System is a 2010 television series co-produced by the BBC and Science Channel, and hosted by physicist Brian Cox. Wonders of the Solar System was first broadcast in the United Kingdom on BBC Two on 7 March 2010. The series comprises five episodes, each of which focuses on an aspect of the Solar System and features a 'wonder' relevant to the theme. The series was described as one of the most successful to appear on BBC Two in recent years. An accompanying book with the same name was also published.

On 31 March 2011, the series won the prestigious George Foster Peabody Award for excellence in documentary film-making.

== Episodes ==
We live on a world of wonders. A place of astonishing beauty and complexity. We have vast oceans and incredible weather. Giant mountains and breath-taking landscapes.

If you think that this is all there is, that our planet exists in magnificent isolation, then you're wrong. We're part of a much wider ecosystem, that extends way beyond the top of our atmosphere.

As a physicist I'm fascinated by how the laws of nature that shaped all this, also shaped the worlds beyond our home planet.

I think we're living through the greatest age of discovery our civilisation has known. We've voyaged to the farthest reaches of the Solar System. We've photographed strange new worlds, stood in unfamiliar landscapes, tasted alien air.

— Professor Brian Cox

=== 1. "Empire of the Sun" ===
The first episode illustrates how the formation and behaviour of the Sun affects each planet in the Solar System. During this episode, Cox visits India to view and explain the workings of a total solar eclipse and the partial eclipses that occur on other planets. He travels to the Iguazu Falls to relate the causality between river levels, and sunspot fluctuations. An explanation of the Earth's exposure to the power of the Sun occurs in Death Valley, California, US, with an experiment inspired by John Herschel's actinometer. He also travels to Norway to observe and explain the defensive role of the Earth's magnetosphere against the Sun's solar wind and its role in forming the Aurora Borealis. Cox then relates the Voyager missions and their continuing exploration of the massive reach of the Sun's gravitational forces on objects in the farthest regions of the Solar System. Finally, in the clear skies of the Atacama Desert, at the Paranal Observatory he is able to observe, with the naked eye, the myriad of stars on the Milky Way and relates the meaning of their diverse colours as mapped on the Hertzsprung–Russell diagram.

=== 2. "Order Out of Chaos" ===
Cox starts this episode in Al-Qayrawan, Tunisia to analyse the orbit of the planets around the Sun, with details on how the 23-degree tilt of the Earth creates the seasonal weather patterns. He also visits the Atlas Mountains, and relates how in clear night skies the ancients observed the rotation of the stars and the retrograde and prograde motion of Mars and the other wandering planets. In Oklahoma, US, he discusses the universal reach of the Coriolis effect and the importance of the conservation of angular momentum. Next, at the Jet Propulsion Laboratory he examines how the Cassini–Huygens space-probe's imagery provides an insight on the highly complex structure of the ice rings of Saturn, and its diverse array of moons, and how they can reveal insights into the formation and evolution of the Solar System. He also explains how Enceladus, as the most reflective object in the known universe, has been of interest due to its continental divide-like canyons and geysers (as also observed in parts of Iceland). In the Sahara Desert the formative effect of winds on sand-dune morphology is paralleled to that of the gravitational effect of Saturn's 61 known moons on the matter that composite the rings - a phenomenon called orbital resonance.

=== 3. "The Thin Blue Line" ===
The third episode looks at the atmosphere of the planets and moons of the Solar System, with Earth, Mars, and Venus being the main focus. The episode starts with Cox travelling to South Africa and taking a journey in an English Electric Lightning up to an altitude of 18 kilometres where the "thinness and fragility" of the atmosphere could be observed in the middle of the day. This is then contrasted with the planet-wide consequences of Mercury's depleted, and Venus' broiling greenhouse atmospheres. Later, the dunal morphology of the Namib Desert is compared to what is known of the surface and depleted atmosphere of Mars, and is used to give an explanation of how the Earth maintains its temperature. Cox then explains how the damaging effect of the Sun's solar wind is deflected by the Earth's magnetosphere. Next, he discusses the transformative effect of weather on a planet's surface, such as the global dust-storms on Mars or the electrical-storms of Jupiter. The episode continues with an in-depth comparison of Saturn's largest moon, Titan, using data gained from the Huygens probe's January 2005 descent down to the frigid methane surface of the moon. It ends with Cox comparing Earth's hydrological cycle with Titan's methanological one.

=== 4. "Dead or Alive" ===
The fourth episode begins at the Grand Canyon, Arizona, US, where Cox draws comparisons of the canyon to Mars and the massive Valles Marineris. A trip to Kīlauea on Hawaii shows the constant geological activity of Earth, and again a comparison to Mars and the massive Olympus Mons is seen. Both comparisons are insightful in the sense that Earth's systems are still dynamic and active whereas Mars' have gradually slowed into inactivity. Cox then switches view closer to the Sun and the scorched greenhouse planet Venus, a planet often referred to as "Earth's twin", and compares it to the vulcan geology of the Deccan Plateau. An example of Earth's interconnectivity with the Solar System reveals that Jupiter's gravitational effect could potentially send an asteroid through the Asteroid Belt on a collision course with Earth, as evidenced by Meteor Crater. The same gravitational force is also shown to give the Jovian moon Io geological life (given the absence of meteor impact evidence there) as paralleled by the volcanism of Erta Ale in Ethiopia. All in all, with the universal laws of physics at play throughout the Solar System, its interconnectedness can also be seen.

=== 5. "Aliens" ===
The final installment covers life surviving in extreme environments, and how the search for life on other worlds follows the search for water. Cox begins by travelling to the deep ocean to draw comparisons between life in the hostile conditions of the deep seabed (on the submersible DSV Alvin) and the parallel potential of non-Earth life. The absence of life-sustaining water in the Atacama Desert in South America is also viewed, which is cited to explain the lack of even basic microbial life there. A trip to the Scablands in North-West America is also made, with an explanation of the Missoula Floods that once occurred there, and how the tell-tale signature of water shaped the landscape geologically. The exploration of Mars has revealed possible evidence of its subterranean hydrology, and a visit to the Cueva de Villa Luz in Mexico shows how simple life-forms (such as archaea and snottites) survive in hostile conditions beneath the earth. Conversely, the hostile frozen topography of Jupiter's moon Europa also reveals the presence and effects of sub-surface water, and Cox visits a cave in Vatnajökull to find microbial signs of life beneath the ice. Cox concludes by stating that Europa represents the "most fascinating and important alien world we know. A true wonder of the Solar System because it's our best hope of finding extraterrestrial life."

== Merchandise ==
An accompanying hardcover book was released on 30 September 2010: Cox, Brian (2010). Wonders of the Solar System. HarperCollins. ISBN 978-0-00-738690-1. The region 1 DVD and Blu-ray discs were released on 7 September 2010. The region 2 DVD and Blu-ray discs of the series were released on 12 April 2010. The region 4 DVD and Blu-ray discs were released on 7 April 2011.

== International broadcast ==
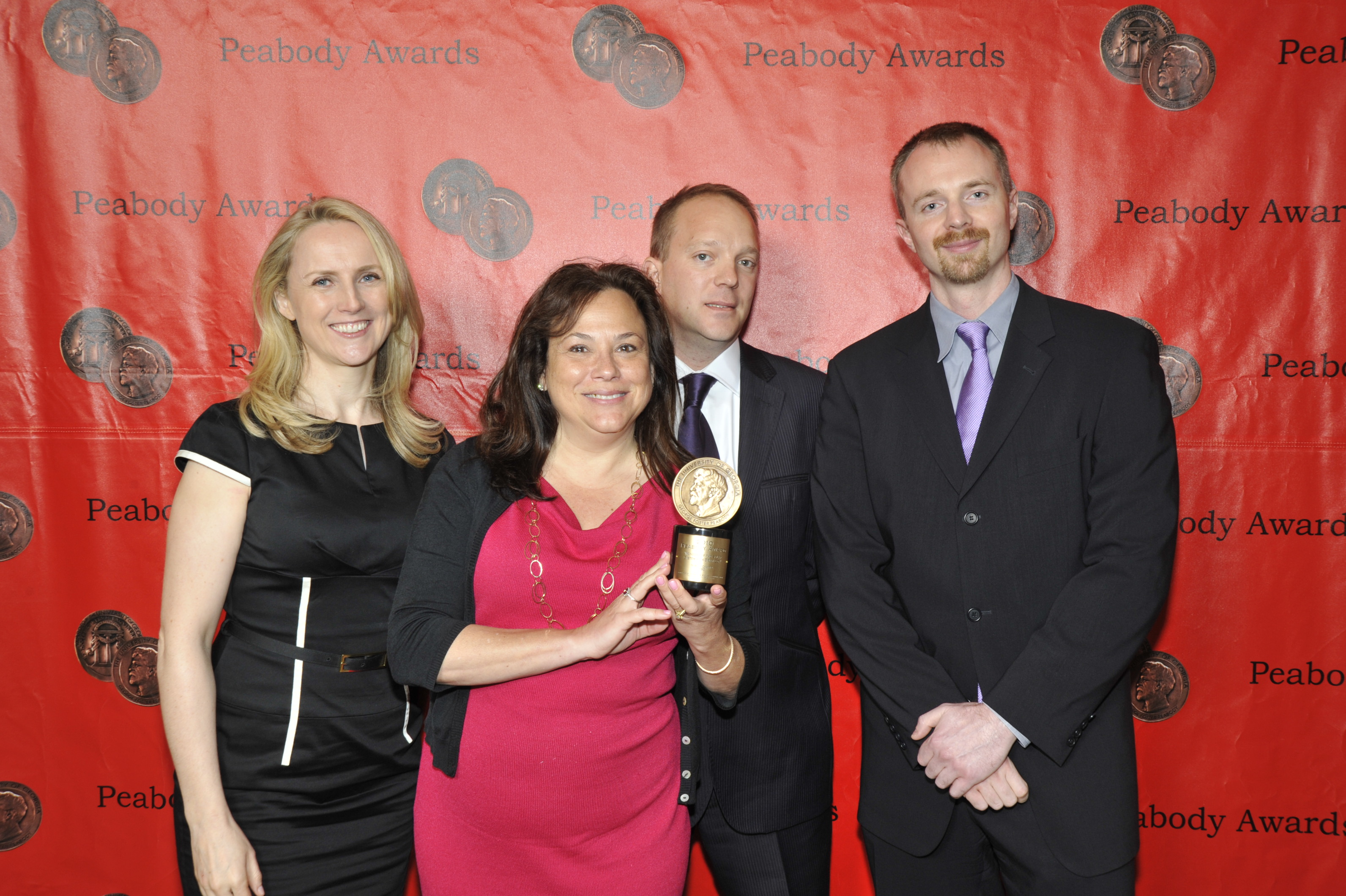
Deborah Adler Myers (Debbie Myers), executive vice president of Science Channel, holds the Peabody Award, May 2011

- In Australia, this programme was aired by SBS One each Tuesday at 8:30pm from 1 March 2011.
- In Austria, this programme was aired by ORF 2 each Thursday at 9:05pm from 8 September 2011 with the re-worked title, Geheimnisse des Lebens (Secrets of Life).
- In Iceland, this programme was aired by RÚV each Monday at 8:10pm from 22 August 2011.
- In the Netherlands, this programme was aired by NTR on Nederland 2 each Sunday at 6:50pm from 17 April 2011.
- In New Zealand, this programme was aired by TVNZ 7 each Friday at 7:05pm from 15 April 2011.
- In Slovakia, this programme was aired on STV1 each Tuesday at 8:15pm from 25 January 2011.
- In the United States, this programme was aired by Science Channel each Wednesday at 9pm E/P from 4 August 2010.

== New series ==
Brian Cox from his Twitter account stated that there would be a second series, Wonders of the Universe, with the same crew and BBC science team. It was first broadcast on 6 March 2011 in the UK. The second series has a similar basis to series one, but features the universe. The new series consisted of four episodes as opposed to the previous five.

== See also ==
- Solar System, a 2024 documentary series narrated by Brian Cox
- Wonders of the Universe
- Wonders of Life
- Human Universe
- Forces of Nature
