= Sheridan Tongue =

TV and film music composer

- Born: Sheridan Tongue
- Occupations: Television and film music composer
- Years active: 1995 – present
- Spouse: Pamela Tongue
- Website: www.sheridantongue.com

Sheridan Tongue is an EMMY-winning and BAFTA-nominated television and film music composer from Belfast, Northern Ireland. He has written and produced soundtracks for many television series including the BBC's Wonders of the Universe and Wonders of the Solar System, Silent Witness (Series 9 – 20), Into The Universe with Stephen Hawking],. Sheridan Tongue's score for Spooks (Series 3), achieved a BAFTA Television Craft nomination for Best Original Television Music.

Sheridan composed all the music for all five seasons of ITV's crime drama 'DCI Banks (Series 1–5)' produced by Left Bank Pictures'.

In 2020 Sheridan Tongue wrote the soundtrack for the BBC series Spotlight On The Troubles: A Secret History, for which he received a Royal Television Society Award NI Nomination for Best Original Music Score.

He has also engineered and mixed records for artists such as Blur, The Verve and received a Gold Record for his work with Beverley Knight

== Early career ==
As a schoolboy he went to the Royal Belfast Academical Institution (RBAI) and the City of Belfast School of Music (CBSM) and enjoyed musical studies before going on to at Surrey University. He graduated in 1989 with a BMus in Music and Sound Recording from the Tonmeister course at the University of Surrey, Tongue spent several years working in many commercial studios around London as a programmer, engineer, session musician and songwriter for recording artists including Blur, Beverly Knight, The Verve and Jocelyn Brown before setting up as a freelance film and television composer.

== Live appearances ==
Sheridan has spoken at conferences around the world about music composing for television including SXSW.

== IN-IS ==
Writing music under the pseudonym IN-IS, Sheridan has released two albums Seven Days and 2068. Hot Press described IN-IS's single Broken Ones feat. Haula as showcasing Sheridan's talent for "sleek electronic production and beautiful construction of sound".

== IN-IS: 2068 ==
2068 is the artist's second IN-IS album was released in October 2020. It explores what the world will look like in fifty years.

Irish folk singer Ailbhe Reddy wrote the lyrics and performs 2068's first single ‘Daydream’, with Tom Adams, Ává Bowers, Johny Satellitesister, David Gledhill, Haula, and Alev Lenz collaborating with Sheridan on other tracks.

Sheridan Tongue says: “2068 is a very personal project, borne out of my desire as an artist to explore what the world would look like many years from now. Back in 2018, I felt that we were living through such a period of intense growth with all the rapid advances in technology, whilst also becoming painfully aware of the effect our modern lifestyles were having on our planet and our wellbeing.”

Sheridan's whole approach with 2068 is unconventional, writing his music first with the lyrics inspired by the individual singers and then woven into the tracks, almost like another instrument designed to elevate each piece.

== Film and television credits ==
=== Film ===
- Shadow Observers
- A to Z (Director - Michael Geoghegan)
- The Kitchen Child (Director - Angela Carter)

=== Television drama ===
- DCI Banks — Series 1 (2010), Series 2 (2011)
- The Sparticle Mystery — (2011)
- Silent Witness — Series 14 (2011)
- Silent Witness — Series 13 (2009)
- Summerhill — (2008)
- Cinderella — (2000)
- Silent Witness — Series 12 (2008)
- Sea of Souls — (2004)
- Silent Witness — Series 11 (2007)
- Dead Clever — (2007)
- Silent Witness — Series 10 (2006)
- Magnificent 7 — (2005) (Winner - Monte Carlo Festival 2006 Signis Prize)
- Silent Witness — Series 9 (2005)
- Spooks — Series 3 (2004) (BAFTA nominated)
- Redcap — Series 2 (2004)
- Down to Earth — Series 1 (2000), Series 2 (2001), Series 3 (2002)
- Sunburn — Series 2 (2000)

=== Television documentaries ===
- Russian Revolution in Color — (2005)
- Wounded — (2009)
- Atlas 4D — (2010)
- Into the Universe with Stephen Hawking — (2010)
- Who Framed Jesus? — (2010)
- Wonders of the Solar System — (2010)
- Curiosity: Did God Create the Universe? — (2011)
- Wonders of the Universe — (2011)
- Stephen Hawking's Grand Design — (2012)
- Stephen Hawking's Favorite Places — (2016)
- Spotlight on the Troubles: A Secret History — (2019)
- Narco Wars — (2020)
- Meerkat Manor: Rise of the Dynasty — (2021)

== Awards ==
- Winner: EMMY for Best Audio - The Last Artifact - 2021
- Nominee: Music & Sound Awards - Silent Witness - 2014
- Nominee: BAFTA for Best Original Television Music - Spooks - 2005
- Gold Disc: Beverly Knight - Prodigal Sista - 1998
