= The Planets (1999 TV series) =

- Genre: Documentary
- Developed by: Christopher Riley
- Directed by: David McNab
- Narrated by: Samuel West (Original) Mark Halliley (Remastered)
- Composer: Jim Meacock
- Country of origin: United Kingdom
- Original language: English
- No. of seasons: 1
- No. of episodes: 8

Production
- Executive producer: John Lynch
- Cinematography: Simon Fanthorpe
- Running time: 390 min. (8 episodes)

Original release
- Network: BBC Two
- Release: 29 April – 17 June 1999

Related
- The Planets 2019 BBC series

The Planets is a documentary miniseries produced by the BBC and A&E and released in 1999. The series was remastered in 2004. It documents the Solar System and its nature, formation, and discovery by humans during the Space Age. The series of eight episodes includes a substantial amount of archival footage from both the United States and Soviet space programs. It also depicts the Solar System through computer graphics. There were a total of eight episodes produced for the series. The series featured appearances from famous pioneering space scientists and explorers, and was narrated by Samuel West in the original 1999 edition, and Mark Halliley in the 2004 remastered edition.

== Episodes ==
Number	Title	Original airdate	Description
1	Different Worlds	29 April 1999	The first episode covers the early attempts at space travel and the development of rocket technology, and discusses the formation of the planets from the nebular hypothesis and accretion theory.
2	Terra Firma	6 May 1999	The story of the terrestrial planets and their exploration.
3	Giants	13 May 1999	Looking at the giant planets of Jupiter, Saturn, Uranus and Neptune and the journeys of Voyager 1 and Voyager 2.
4	Moon	20 May 1999	Detailing the Moon and the race to reach it during the "Space race" years.
5	Star	27 May 1999	Concentrating on the Sun, the early belief in it being a god and the science behind its behaviour.
6	Atmosphere	3 June 1999	A look at the atmosphere of our planet and those in the rest of the Solar System.
7	Life	10 June 1999	A journey into looking for life on other planets and trying to find if life elsewhere really does exist.
8	Destiny	17 June 1999	The final episode explores the future of the Solar System, plus research into extrasolar planets.

Commentators in episode 1 include Hal Levison, George Wetherill, and David Levy.

Commentators in episode 4 include Apollo 17 Lunar Module Pilot Harrison Schmidt, while episode 5 features Apollo 12 Commander Charles Conrad and solar physicist Eugene Parker (of whom the NASA Parker Solar Probe was named in tribute), episode 6 retired USAF Colonel and Project Excelsiot pilot Joe Kittinger, and episode 8 Apollo 17 Commander and last human to walk on the Moon Eugene Cernan.

Commentators in episode 5 include Douglas Gough. It also talks about Angelo Secchi who pioneered the field of astronomical spectroscopy.

Other notable commentators include James Van Allen, Sergei Khrushchev (son of Nikita Khrushchev and aerospace engineer), Alexei Leonov, Boris Chertok and Carolyn Porco.

== DVD release ==
The DVD of the series was released on 24 January 2000.

== Book ==
A hardcover book accompanying the series broadcast was released on 22 April 1999. The Planets. David McNab and James Younger. Yale University Press. ISBN 978-0-300-08044-5
