= Jodrell Bank Centre for Astrophysics =

Astrophysics centre at the University of Manchester, England

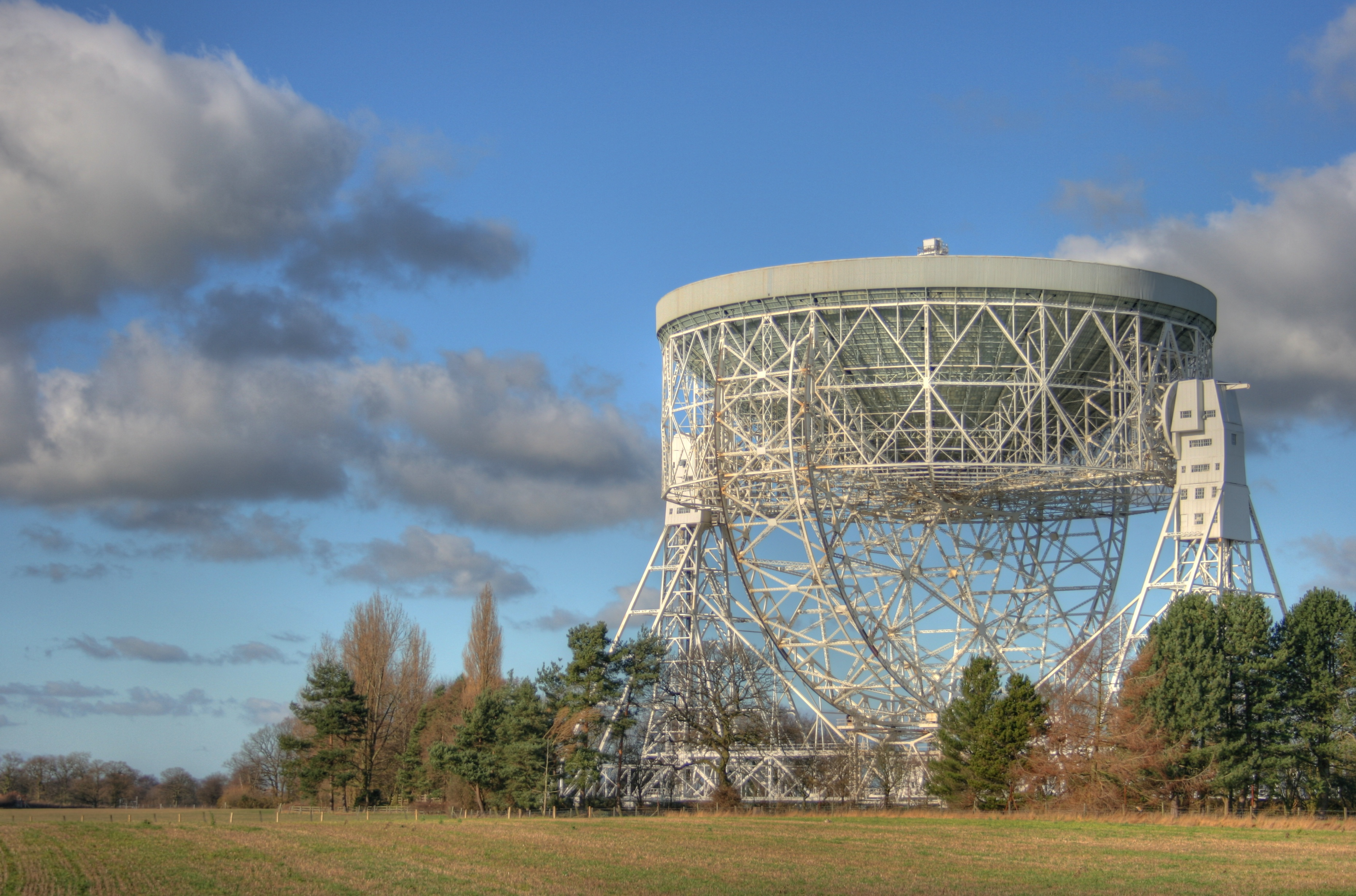
The Lovell Telescope at Jodrell Bank Observatory, part of the Jodrell Bank Centre for Astrophysics

The Jodrell Bank Centre for Astrophysics (JBCA) at the University of Manchester is among the largest astrophysics groups in the UK. It includes the Jodrell Bank Observatory, the MERLIN/VLBI National Facility, and the Jodrell Bank Visitor Centre. The centre was formed after the merger of the Victoria University of Manchester and the University of Manchester Institute of Science and Technology (UMIST), which brought two astronomy groups together. The Jodrell Bank site also hosts the headquarters of the Square Kilometre Array Observatory (SKAO) - the international governmental organisation (IGO) tasked with the delivery and operation of the Square Kilometre Array (SKA), created on the signing of the Rome Convention in 2019. The SKA will be the largest telescope in the world.

The JBCA is part of the School of Physics and Astronomy. The current director is Professor Michael Garrett.

== Research ==
The research at the Centre focuses on:

- Astrochemistry
- Astrophysical masers
- The Cosmic Microwave Background
- Galaxy formation and evolution
- Gravitational lenses
- Theoretical astrophysics and cosmology
- Planetary nebulae
- Pulsars
- Stellar physics (including star formation and solar plasmas)
- Development of telescope receivers

== Jodrell Bank Observatory ==
The Jodrell Bank Observatory, located near Goostrey and Holmes Chapel in Cheshire, has played an important role in the research of meteors, quasars, pulsars, masers and gravitational lenses, and was heavily involved with the tracking of space probes at the start of the Space Age.

The main telescope at the observatory is the Lovell Telescope, which is the third largest steerable radio telescope in the world. There are three other active telescopes located at the observatory; the Mark II, as well as 42 ft and 7m-diameter radio telescopes. Jodrell Bank Observatory is also the base of the Multi-Element Radio Linked Interferometer Network (MERLIN), a National Facility run by the University of Manchester on behalf of UK Research and Innovation.
