= Neil Burgess (neuroscientist) =

British neuroscientist (born 1966)

Neil Burgess FRS FMedSci
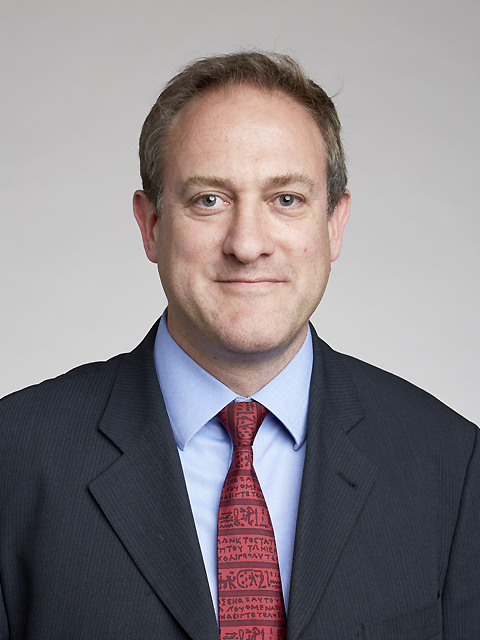
- Burgess in 2017
- Born: 13 July 1966 (age 60); Oakington, Cambridgeshire, England
- Education: Newnham Croft Primary School; Parkside Community College; Hills Road Sixth Form College; University College London; University of Manchester
- Spouse: Cathryn McDowell (m. 1997)
- Children: 3
- Awards: Royal Society University Research Fellowship
- Scientific career
- Fields: Neuroscience
- Workplaces: University College London
- Thesis: Neural networks, human memory and optimisation (1990)
- Doctoral advisor: Michael Moore
- Website: www.ucl.ac.uk/icn/neilburgess

Neil Burgess (born 13 July 1966) is a British neuroscientist. He has been a professor of cognitive neuroscience at University College London since 2004 and a Wellcome Trust Principal Research Fellow since 2011. He has made important contributions to understanding memory and spatial cognition by developing computational models relating behaviour to activity in biological neural networks.

== Early life and education ==
Neil Burgess was born on 13 July 1966 in Oakington, Cambridgeshire, to Alan and Lore Burgess (née Freudenthal). He was educated at three schools in Cambridge: Newnham Croft Primary School, Parkside Community College, and Hills Road Sixth Form College.

Burgess studied mathematics and physics as an undergraduate at University College London, graduating with first-class honours in 1987. He then completed postgraduate study in theoretical physics in the School of Physics and Astronomy at the University of Manchester, supervised by Michael Moore, where he began working on models of memory with Graham Hitch. Burgess was awarded a PhD in 1990.

== Research and career ==
Burgess has developed models to explain how networks of neurons allow us to represent, remember and imagine our location within the surrounding environment. These models provide a quantitative understanding of how spatial memory, episodic memory and autobiographical memory function (and dysfunction) depend on human brain activity. With Tom Hartley at the University of York and Colin Lever at Durham University he both predicted and discovered neurons representing environmental boundaries.

=== Awards and honours ===
Burgess was elected a Fellow of the Academy of Medical Sciences (FMedSci) in 2009 and a Fellow of the Royal Society (FRS) in 2017 having previously held a Royal Society University Research Fellowship from 1993 to 2001.

== Personal life ==
Burgess married Cathryn Jane McDowell in 1997. They have two sons and one daughter.
