= List of fellows of the Royal Society elected in 1995 =

This is a list of fellows of the Royal Society elected in 1995.

== Fellows ==
1. Martin Arthur Bennett
2. Iain Donald Campbell (1941 – 2014)
3. Johnson Robin Cann
4. Keith Frederick Chater
5. Francis Edward Corrigan
6. Edward Brian Davies
7. Graham Dixon-Lewis (died 2010)
8. Richard Salisbury Ellis
9. Graham Douglas Farquhar
10. Jeffrey Barry Harborne (1928–2002)
11. Dame Julia Stretton Higgins
12. Jonathan Charles Howard
13. Guy Antony Jameson
14. Jack Henri Kaplan
15. Gurdev Khush
16. Anthony Ledwith
17. Frank Matthews Leslie (1935–2000)
18. Christopher John Marshall
19. Robin Marshall
20. Paul James Mason
21. David Andrew Barclay Miller
22. Richard Alan North
23. Timothy John Pedley
24. Geoffrey James Pert
25. Sir Keith Peters
26. Jeremy David Pickett-Heaps
27. Richard John Roberts
28. Sir Joseph Rotblat (1908–2005)
29. Jeremy Keith Morris Sanders
30. Robert Malcolm Simmons
31. Ian William Murison Smith
32. Peter Henry Andrews Sneath (1923–2011)
33. Laszlo Solymar
34. Roger John Tayler (1929–1997)
35. Richard Lawrence Taylor
36. Shirley Marie Tilghman
37. Sir John Ernest Walker
38. Stephen Craig West
39. Colin George Windsor
40. Andrew Hamilton Wyllie

== Foreign members ==
1. Gertrude Belle Elion (1918–1999)
2. Ugo Fano (1912–2001)
3. Salome Gluecksohn-Waelsch (died 2007)
4. Rita Levi-Montalcini (1909–2012)
5. Calvin Forrest Quate
6. John Archibald Wheeler (1911–2008)
