= Robin Marshall =

British physicist

Robin Marshall FRS FInstP
- Born: 1940 (age 85–86)
- Education: Ermysted's Grammar School
- Alma mater: University of Manchester (BSc, PhD)
- Scientific career
- Fields: Physics
- Workplaces: Rutherford Appleton Laboratory; University of Manchester
- Thesis: Development of sonic spark chambers and a study of the reaction π^{−}p → π^{+}π^{−}n in the 1 GeV/c region (1965)
- Doctoral advisor: R. J. Ellison
- Doctoral students: Brian Cox
- Website: robinmarshall.eu

Robin Marshall (born 1940) FRS is an Emeritus professor of Physics & Biology in the School of Physics and Astronomy at the University of Manchester.

== Education ==
Marshall was educated at Ermysted's Grammar School in Skipton and the University of Manchester where he was awarded a Bachelor of Science degree in 1962 followed by a PhD in 1965 for research developing sonic spark chambers and studying pion pair production in pion proton interactions.

== Career and research ==
Marshall is an innovator in the field of high-energy electron–positron annihilation, making many personal contributions. He was the first at the Positron–Electron Tandem Ring Accelerator (PETRA) e^{+}e^{−} collider at the Deutsches Elektronen-Synchrotron (DESY) to determine the electroweak properties of leptons and then quarks. These papers become templates for other experimenters over the next ten years. He performed the definitive analysis of the world's electron–positron data to produce what are now the textbook results for the Quantum Chromodynamics (QCD) 'fine structure' constant and the fermion electroweak interaction parameters. In 1984, he published a novel method for isolating bottom quark events and then used the method to measure the b electroweak properties, showing that it belonged to a weak isospin doublet state, and hence that the top quark must exist. This was one of several significant physics results from PETRA. He was a group leader at Rutherford Appleton Laboratory (RAL) from 1978 to 1992, and in the 1990s led the British involvement in an experiment at the electron–proton collider, Hadron-Elektron-Ringanlage (HERA), at DESY.

=== Awards and honours ===
Marshall was elected a Fellow of the Royal Society (FRS) in 1995 and was a Fellow of the Institute of Physics (FInstP) from 1996 to 2018.

In 1997, he was awarded the Max Born Medal and Prize by the German Physical Society.

=== Publications ===
Marshall has published a comprehensive history of "Three Centuries of Manchester Physics", in five volumes, covering the scientific, cultural, social and political aspects of the evolution of the subject in the city and its immediate surroundings.

In 2018, he published a book containing letters written mainly by physicists to the Nobel Prize winner William Lawrence Bragg during the first worlds war, providing fresh insight into the deeds and thoughts of scientists active in the front line of battle.

In 2019, he published a history of the discovery of transmutation in Manchester by Ernest Rutherford in 1919.

He has written one work of fiction "The Nobel Conspiracy".
