= Michael Edwards (art therapist) =

English art therapist (1930–2010)

Michael Edwards (2 November 1930 – 13 March 2010) was a painter, pioneer art therapist, analytical psychologist and curator of the picture archive of the artwork of patients of C. G. Jung. He was also the first Emeritus Professor of Art Therapy at Concordia University in Montreal, Canada.

Michael Edwards was born in 1930 near Epping Forest on the eastern outskirts of London, England. After national service he studied at the St Albans Art College with the painter Norman Adams.

Edwards was greatly influenced by Irene Champernowne, the founder of the Withymead centre in Devon, a therapeutic community where Edwards and other artists and therapists lived together with people in fragile mental health. Withymead was based on Jungian ideas and belief in the healing power of the visual and expressive arts. Edwards was the course director for the annual residential summer trainings at the Champernowne Trust until 2005.

Edwards was an early and leading proponent of the field of art therapy. He was a founding member, chair, fellow and honorary life member of the British Association of Art Therapists. In 1969 he set up one of the first art therapy training courses in the world, located in Birmingham. The course later offered a master's degree. Around 1981 he established the first university-based art therapy training program in Canada, at Concordia University in Montreal, which later included a master's degree. This Masters of Arts in Art Therapy degree remains unique in Canada.

Edwards' efforts to preserve and bring order to the archive of patient art collected by Jung and his followers was deeply related to his understanding of the importance Jung placed on his own art making and that of his patients. Edwards observed that Jung made art about his inner experiences as a "vivid source of personal insight into his situation; this, in turn, informed the development of his psychological theories. No other major psychologist has attended to his own inner life through imagery in this way".

As a Jungian teacher and practitioner, Edwards influenced the field of art therapy internationally to appreciate the potential of symbols and images to carry multiple and ambiguous meanings. He taught that approaching a painting or a drawing as if it were "independent and semi-autonomous" would amplify rather than reduce its meanings and allow imaginative dialogue, to the end of deepening understanding of the art for both the patient and the therapist.

Edwards died in 2010 in Falmouth, Cornwall. He was survived by his third wife and by seven children, including Tamsin Edwards.

== Selected publications ==
- "Art therapy now". Inscape, 5(1), 18-21. (1981)
- "Jungian analytic art therapy". In Judith A. Rubin (Ed.), Approaches to art therapy: Theory and technique (pp. 92–113). New York: Brunner/Mazel. (1987).
- "Learning from images". In R. Goldstein (Ed.), Images, meanings, and connections: Essays in memory of Susan R. Bach. Einseideln, Switzerland: Daimon Verlag. (1999).
- A Jungian circumambulation of art & therapy: Ornithology for the birds. Exeter: Insider Art. (2010).
