= Mark Lancaster =

Mark Lancaster may refer to:

- Mark Lancaster, Baron Lancaster of Kimbolton (born 1970), British Conservative politician
- Mark Lancaster (artist) (1938–2021), British artist and set designer
