= The Planets (2019 TV series) =

- Genre: Documentary
- Directed by: Stephen Cooter; Martin Johnson
- Presented by: Brian Cox (UK version)
- Narrated by: Zachary Quinto (U.S. version)
- Opening theme: "The Void" by Muse
- Composers: Anže Rozman; Andrew Christie
- Country of origin: United Kingdom
- Original language: English
- No. of seasons: 1
- No. of episodes: 5

Production
- Executive producer: Andrew Cohen
- Producer: Gideon Bradshaw
- Editor: Louise Salkow
- Production companies: BBC Studios; with Nova and WGBH Boston; co-produced by PBS and Tencent Penguin Pictures

Original release
- Network: BBC Two
- Release: 29 May – 25 June 2019

Related
- The Planets (1999 BBC series); Nova

The Planets is a 2019 BBC/PBS/Tencent/Open University television documentary series about the Solar System presented by Professor Brian Cox in the UK version and Zachary Quinto in the US version.

First broadcast on BBC Two beginning Tuesday 28 May 2019, the five-episode series looks at each planet in detail, examining scientific theories and hypotheses about the formation and evolution of the Solar System gained by uncrewed missions to the planets. Originally released in the UK, it was changed to cater more to the American audience watching on PBS's series Nova.

Cox presents segments to camera from various locations around the world alongside extensive computer-generated imagery and footage from space missions. The series was created as a partnership between BBC Studios and the Open University.

== Episodes ==
No.	Title	US title	Directed by	Original release date	UK viewers (millions)
1	"A Moment in the Sun – The Terrestrial Planets"	Inner Worlds	Martin Johnson	28 May 2019	3.24
Examining the rocky planets at the centre of the Solar System, Professor Cox examines new evidence about the violent creation of Mercury and the hostile atmosphere of Venus, contrasting them with the life-giving planet Earth and the barren Mars.
2	"The Two Sisters – Earth & Mars"	Mars	Stephen Cooter	4 June 2019	3.25
Professor Cox contrasts the two rocky planets in the habitable zone, looking at how Mars lost its water and atmosphere, in stark contrast to the life-giving oasis of Earth.
3	"The Godfather – Jupiter"	Jupiter	Stephen Cooter	11 June 2019	3.03
Looking at the gas giant Jupiter, the largest and oldest planet in the solar system, Professor Cox discusses how it shaped its part of the solar system, including its huge gravitational influence and its effect on the Asteroid Belt and its largest object Ceres.
4	"Life Beyond the Sun – Saturn"	Saturn	Nic Stacey	18 June 2019	2.39
Cox looks at the gas giant Saturn, with its distinctive rings and a plethora of moons, examining the new evidence discovered by the NASA Cassini–Huygens mission.
5	"Into the Darkness – Ice Worlds"	Ice Worlds	Martin Johnson	25 June 2019	2.30
Uranus, Neptune and the new discoveries being made by the NASA New Horizons probe to reveal more about the mysterious dwarf planet Pluto and the Kuiper belt.

== Merchandise ==
A 288-page hardback book written by Brian Cox and Andrew Cohen was released on 23 May 2019. by HarperCollins (ISBN 978-0007488841). The book was also released for ebook readers as well as an audiobook on the same day.
