= Human Universe =

TV series with Brian Cox

- Genre: Documentary series
- Presented by: Professor Brian Cox
- Composer: Philip Sheppard
- Country of origin: United Kingdom
- Original language: English
- No. of series: 1
- No. of episodes: 5

Production
- Executive producer: Andrew Cohen
- Producer: Gideon Bradshaw
- Cinematography: Paul O'Callaghan
- Running time: 60 minutes
- Production company: BBC / Science Channel co-production

Original release
- Network: BBC Two; BBC Two HD
- Release: 7 October – 4 November 2014

Related
- Wonders of Life (2013); Forces of Nature (2016)

Human Universe is a British television series broadcast on BBC Two, presented by Professor Brian Cox. An accompanying book was also published.

== Production ==
Human Universe was commissioned by Janice Hadlow for BBC Two and Kim Shillinglaw, head commissioner for science and natural history. The series consists of five sixty-minute episodes.

== International broadcast ==
- Australia – This programme premiered on ABC on 7 January 2015, under the title Human Universe with Brian Cox.
- Flanders – International version of this programme (Brian Cox replaced by different local presenters) premiered on the VRT, which reaches the Flemish inhabitants of Belgium, on 3 June 2015, under the title Human Universe.
- Hong Kong – This programme premiered on TVB Pearl on 24 June 2015.
- United States – This programme premiered on Science Channel on 10 June 2015, under the title Hacking the Universe.

== Merchandise ==
DVD releases of the series are set to be released on 10 November 2014. A book, written by Brian Cox and Andrew Cohen, accompanying the series was released on 9 October 2014, with a Kindle e-book version also made available on 31 October 2014.

== See also ==
- Wonders of the Universe
- Wonders of the Solar System
- Wonders of Life
- Forces of Nature
