= The Science of Doctor Who =

- Written by: Brian Cox
- Directed by: Steve Smith
- Starring: Brian Cox; Matt Smith; Dallas Campbell; Jim Al-Khalili; Charles Dance; Rufus Hound
- Country of origin: United Kingdom
- Original language: English

Production
- Producers: Andrew Cohen; Milla Harrison-Hansley
- Running time: 60 minutes

Original release
- Network: BBC Two
- Release: 14 November 2013

The Science of Doctor Who is a televised lecture by physicist Brian Cox discussing the nature of space and time as related to the science fiction series Doctor Who. Cox covers topics including the nature of black holes, time dilation, time as a dimension in which to travel and the possibilities of alien life. The lecture is held at the Royal Institution's lecture hall and interspersed with small segments of Cox on the TARDIS with the Eleventh Doctor, played by Matt Smith.

== Home media ==
The lecture was released on DVD and Blu-ray on 8 September 2014 as an added extra on the limited edition Doctor Who 50th Anniversary Collection Boxset, where it was re-titled A Night with the Stars: The Science of Doctor Who.
