= Wonders of the Universe =

2011 British television series

- Genre: Documentary series
- Directed by: Chris Holt; Stephen Cooter; Michael Lachmann
- Presented by: Professor Brian Cox
- Theme music composer: Sheridan Tongue
- Country of origin: United Kingdom
- Original language: English
- No. of series: 1
- No. of episodes: 4

Production
- Executive producers: Jonathan Renouf; Wyatt Channell
- Running time: 60 minutes

Original release
- Network: BBC Two; BBC HD
- Release: 6 March – 27 March 2011

Related
- Wonders of the Solar System (2010); Wonders of Life (2013)

Wonders of the Universe is a 2011 television series produced by the BBC, Discovery Channel, and Science Channel, hosted by physicist Professor Brian Cox. Wonders of the Universe was first broadcast in the United Kingdom on BBC Two from 6 March 2011. The series comprises four episodes, each of which focuses on an aspect of the universe and features a 'wonder' relevant to the theme. It follows on from Cox's 2010 series for the BBC, Wonders of the Solar System. An accompanying book with the same title was also published.

== Episodes ==
Why are we here? Where do we come from? These are the most enduring of questions. And it's an essential part of human nature to want to find the answers.

We can trace our ancestry back hundreds of thousands of years to the dawn of humankind. But in reality, our story extends far, further back in time. Our story starts with the beginning of the universe. It began 13.7 billion years ago, and today, it's filled with over a hundred billion galaxies, each containing hundreds of billions of stars.

In this series, I want to tell that story, because ultimately, we are part of the universe, so its story is our story.

— Professor Brian Cox's opening narration

=== 1. "Destiny" ===
In the first episode, Cox considers the fundamental nature of time while pondering the ruins at Chankillo in Peru. He explores the familiarly brief cycles of time that define the lives of humans on Earth (such as days, months, and years), and compares them to the cycles of time on a cosmically universal scale (such as the Solar System's 250 million year circuit around the Milky Way). At the Perito Moreno Glacier Cox introduces the Arrow of Time and the idea of irreversible change using GRB 090423 as an remnant of the early Stelliferous Era. At Kolmanskop he further discusses the thermodynamic arrow of time citing the inevitable increase of entropy, and stellar evolution. He continues by looking at Proxima Centauri, a slow burning red dwarf, and concludes the show over the Skeleton Coast of the Namib Desert, using the wreck of the Eduard Bohlen to illustrate the inevitable heat death of the universe.

=== 2. "Stardust" ===
Cox travels to Kathmandu and visits the Pashupatinath Temple where he discusses the link between the stars and the elements of which all living things, including humans, are made. He explores the beginnings of the universe and the origins of humanity, going far back in time to look at the process of stellar evolution and comparing it to the formation cycle of the Himalayas. He describes 92 known elements found on Earth, which are mirrored in the spectrum observed through stellar classification. In northern Chile at El Tatio he compares the three states of water to the states found in the universe. He further explains how these basic elements are combined to form complexity through nuclear fusion. However, heavier elements than the first 26 only form when stars die and eject material during a supernova. In an abandoned prison in Rio de Janeiro Cox describes the dying stages of fusion, and in the 16-to-1 Mine he describes how the rarest and heaviest elements are made. In the Atacama Desert he concludes with the recycling of matter in the Universe and the possibility that the Earth was seeded with life from space.

=== 3. "Falling" ===
This episode documents how gravity has a profound effect across the universe, and Cox seeks out a non-space zero-gravity experience to highlight his point. From the formation of galaxies and stars to the patterns of uplift and erosion seen on Earth, gravity is centrally important. Examples are given, such as the tidal force that captured and locked the Moon over time, or more massively in the projected collision between the Andromeda and Milky Way Galaxies. Cox then enters a high-G training centrifuge to show how on Earth, gravity is a relatively weak force, but elsewhere in the Universe it is significantly stronger. In Chaco Culture National Historical Park he refers to Carl Sagan's Cosmos, and its link to a 3-week long supernova in 1054. The almost unimaginable crushing gravitational power of the Crab Pulsar is then contrasted to the distance of an atom's nucleus to its orbiting electrons. Finally, there is a look back at how Einstein's research on gravity has enabled us to better understand how gravity actually works within both "the falling valley" of spacetime and the "event horizon" of black holes.

=== 4. "Messengers" ===
The final episode shows how the unique properties of visible light provide an insight into the origins and development of mankind and the Universe. At Karnak Temple in Egypt he observes the sunrise of the winter solstice through precisely aligned stone columns. The central star of the Lagoon Nebula, Herschel 36, and Eta Carinae are then compared to the Sun, and the light from distant objects such as these allows us to engage on a journey back in time. Aboard a Hawker Hunter he easily breaks the sound barrier, but a speed of light was not first considered until the time of Ole Rømer in the 1670s. Cox then explains how the limitations of the light barrier allow scientists to measure distance and time with accuracy, and to peer back into the distant corners of the universe's creation. In 2003-2004 the Hubble Ultra-Deep Field captured images of galaxies 13 billion light-years distant, and a rainbow over the Victoria Falls in Zambia reveals a red-blue spectrum. The stretched "Invisible light" of the Big Bang is also discussed as part of the Cosmic microwave background as seen in the WMAP image. At Burgess Shale in Yoho National Park he concludes the series with the evolution of the eye and pikaia.

== Rebroadcast ==
The US broadcast was originally aired weekly from on 27 July to 17 August 2011, with the episodes re-titled as "Cosmos Made Conscious", "Children of the Stars", "The Known", and "On Beams of Light". The four episodes were repeated as part of the BBC Learning Zone (intended for use in Secondary Schools) in an early morning slot (5.00 - 6.00 am) on Wednesdays from the end of September 2011 on BBC Two. Each one-hour programme carried a subtitle ("Learning Shorts") and was segmented into 3 continuous short films (of approximately 20 minutes' duration) with separate titles, making 12 in total. The original episode titles were not used.

== Reception ==
The initial episode gained viewing figures of 6 million people when it was first shown on the BBC, and it was the first BBC factual show to top the iTunes chart. The series received generally positive reviews. Chris Harvey of the Daily Telegraph said "Cox is different. Scientists who can capture the popular imagination come along extremely rarely ... These days, science programmes regularly provide some of the most striking images ever seen on the small screen", and Tom Sutcliffe of The Independent commented "it's big on cosmic dazzlement and mind-boggling perspectives and full of epic orchestration and screen-saver graphics." Sam Wollaston of The Guardian chose to focus on Cox's presenting style rather than the scientific content of the programme.

Following complaints from viewers that the background music was loud enough to make Cox's narration difficult to hear, the BBC agreed to remix the sound for all the episodes. Cox thought this was a mistake, as he believed the series should be a "cinematic experience". The DVD and Blu-ray versions are released with the original sound mix as opposed to the broadcast versions.

== Merchandise ==
The accompanying hardcover book was released on 3 March 2011: Cox, Brian (2011). Wonders of the Universe. HarperCollins. ISBN 978-0-00-739582-8. A soundtrack album of music composed for Wonders of the Universe by Sheridan Tongue (including selected music from Wonders of the Solar System) was released to coincide with the first airing of the show on BBC Two. The Region 1 DVD and Blu-ray discs were released on 30 August 2011. The Region 2 DVD and Blu-ray discs were released on 4 April 2011. The Region 4 DVD and Blu-ray discs were released on 1 September 2011.

== International broadcast ==
- Australia - aired by ABC1 each Tuesday at 8:30pm from 19 July 2011.
- Denmark - aired by DR2 every night at 7pm from 2–5 January 2012, retitled as, Universets gåder (Mysteries of the Universe).
- India - aired by BBC Entertainment each Wednesday at 9pm from 7 March 2012.
- New Zealand - aired by TVNZ 7 each Saturday at 7:05pm from 6 August 2011.
- United States - aired by Science each Wednesday at 9pm E/P from 27 July 2011. The episodes were renamed and were not shown in order, instead broadcasting episode 2, 1, then 3 and 4.

== See also ==
- Wonders of the Solar System
- Wonders of Life
- Human Universe
- Forces of Nature
