= Dare (band) =

English rock band

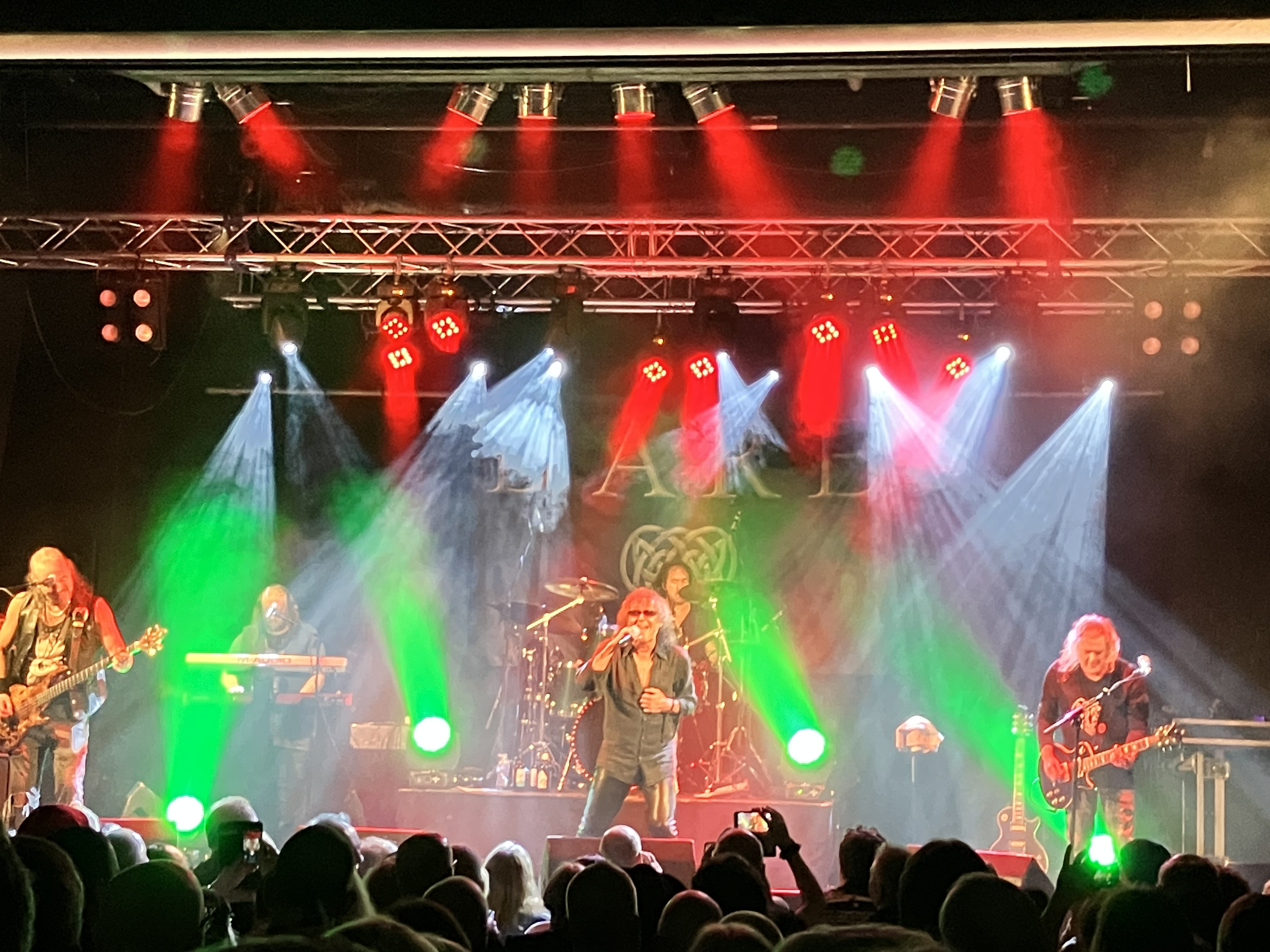
- Dare performing in 2025 at Holmfirth Picturedrome; Darren Wharton (front-centre) and (left to right) Marc Roberts (keys), Nigel Clutterbuck (bass), Greg Morgan (drums) and Vinny Burns (lead)

Background information
- Origin: Oldham, England
- Genres: AOR, hard rock, pop rock
- Years active: 1985–1992; 1998–present
- Labels: A&M Records (1988–92); MTM; Legend Records (current)
- Members: Darren Wharton; Vinny Burns; Nigel Clutterbuck; Greg Morgan; Marc Roberts
- Past members: Past members
- Website: darebandofficial.com

Dare are an English rock band from Oldham, fronted by former Thin Lizzy keyboard player Darren Wharton. They formed in 1985 and have released twelve albums to date, eleven studio and one live. Their most recent release is the band's first compilation album, The Best of Dare, which released in 2025.

== History ==
=== Early days ===
Dare was formed in 1985 by former Thin Lizzy keyboard player Darren Wharton after Phil Lynott had dissolved the band. By 1987, Dare had gained a local following in Oldham and were signed with a four-year deal by A&M Records.

The band's debut album, Out of the Silence, was released in 1988. It was recorded in Los Angeles at singer Joni Mitchell's private studio in Beverly Hills. The lineup consisted of Darren Wharton (vocals/keyboards), Vinny Burns (guitars), Martin "Shelley" Shelton (bass), James Ross (drums), and future physicist Brian Cox (keyboards).

The follow-up album Blood from Stone was released in 1991, Blood from Stone peaked at No. 48 in the UK Albums Chart and the band enjoyed minor success in Europe, album sales flagged and the band was dropped by A&M. By that time, Dare had released five singles which had charted in the UK Singles Chart: "Abandon" (No. 71, 1989), "Nothing Is Stronger Than Love" (No. 95, 1989) and "The Raindance" (No. 62, 1989) from Out of the Silence, and "We Don't Need a Reason" (No. 52, 1991) and "Real Love" (No. 67, 1991) from Blood from Stone.

=== Lineup reshuffle ===
A third album was not released until 1998—Calm Before the Storm, produced by Wharton. By that time, Burns, Cox and Clutterbuck had departed, and the band consisted of Andrew Moore on guitars, Martin Wilding on bass, and brothers Julian Gardner on drums and Simon Gardner on keyboards. Also listed as "additional musicians” were Kevin Whitehead on drums and Richard Dews on acoustic guitar and backing vocals.

Calm Before the Storm marked another change in style towards a mellower sound with Celtic influences. A year after its release, Calm Before the Storm was reissued in the UK on Wharton's own label, Legend Records. The band's next album, Belief, was released in 2001. By this time Dews was credited as a full-fledged member of the band, alongside Wharton, Moore and Julian Gardner. The leadoff single, "White Horses", was playlisted by Sir Terry Wogan on the UK's largest national radio station, BBC Radio 2. Tours throughout Europe and Scandinavia were to follow, including a 12 date tour with Asia in the UK.

In the summer of 2004, the band released their fifth album, Beneath the Shining Water. The single "Sea of Roses" once again received considerable airplay on Radio 2. The supporting tour was captured on the band's first live album, The Power of Nature: Live in Munich, released the following year in both CD and DVD editions, the latter of which included a series of interviews with Wharton in which he chronicles the history of the band. In 2008 Belief and Beneath the Shining Water were released as a double CD though Warner Music/ADA in the U.S.; this edition again featured a bonus track, a re-recording of the Blood from Stone song "Real Love".

=== Return of Vinny Burns ===
In October 2009, Arc of the Dawn was released. Founding member Vinny Burns returned to the band for the subsequent tour. This lineup was retained for Calm Before the Storm 2; released in 2012, the album is a re-recording of the band's third album Calm Before the Storm with a slightly altered track listing.

Dare released Sacred Ground in July 2016. MelodicRock.com said that "the album features some of Wharton's most mature song writing to date. Thought provoking and passionate, whilst still retaining a dark rock edge".

=== Road to Eden and beyond ===
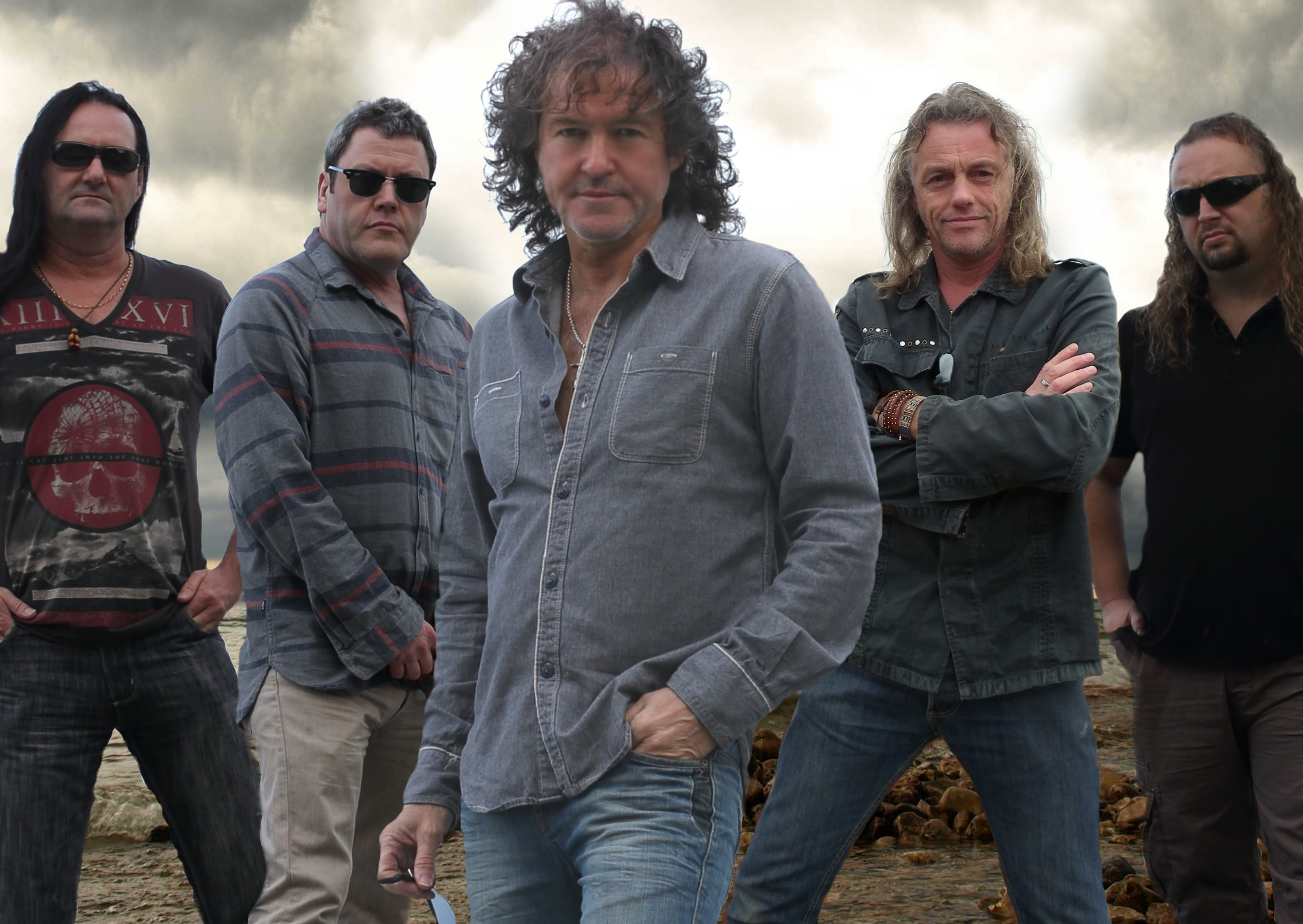
Dare circa 2016; in 2023 Greg Morgan replaced Kev Whitehead (far left) on drums

The latest Dare album, Road to Eden, was released in 2022. The lineup for the album remained unchanged from the preceding releases, consisting of Wharton, Burns, Whitehead and Clutterbuck, with Marc Roberts on keyboard. Additional dates were later added, these including an appearance at Cambridge Rock Festival.

In June 2025 the band released their first compilation album, The Best of Dare. Published through Darren Wharton's Legend Records label, the double-CD set features 34 tracks selected by the band from the entire Dare catalogue.

== Band members ==
=== Current members ===
- Darren Wharton – vocals, keyboards, keytar (1985–1992, 1998–present)
- Vinny Burns – guitar (1985–1992, 2008–present)
- Nigel Clutterbuck – bass (1989–1992, 2014–present)
- Marc Roberts – keyboards (live) (2006–present)
- Greg Morgan – drums (1991–1992, 2023–present)

=== Past members ===
- Brian Cox – keyboards (1986–1992)
- Richard "Richie" Dews – guitar (1991–2014)
- Brian Drawbridge – bass (1998–2000)
- Julian Gardner – drums (1998–2002)
- Simon Gardner – keyboards (1998–2002)
- Gavin Mart – drums (2002–2006)
- Andrew "Andy" Moore – guitar (1998–2006)
- James Ross – drums (1985–1989)
- Martin "Shelley" Shelton – bass (1985–1989)
- Mark Simpson – keyboards (1986)
- Ed Stratton – drums (1985)
- Kev Whitehead – drums (*2008-2023) (* first credit)
- Martin Wilding – bass (1998)

== Discography ==
=== Studio albums ===
==== Out of the Silence (1988) ====
Track listing

All tracks are written by Darren Wharton, except where noted. Track lengths are taken from the original release; many of the songs were edited with slightly faster fade-outs for the 2008 remaster.

No.	Title	Writer(s)	Length
1.	"Abandon"	Wharton, Vinny Burns	4:38
2.	"Into the Fire"		4:53
3.	"Nothing Is Stronger Than Love"	Wharton, Burns	4:42
4.	"Runaway"		4:27
5.	"Under the Sun"		6:13
6.	"The Raindance"		5:24
7.	"King of Spades"		4:44
8.	"Heartbreaker"	Wharton, Burns	3:38
9.	"Return the Heart"		5:09
10.	"Don't Let Go"	Wharton, Burns	5:57

==== Blood from Stone (1991) ====
Track listing

All tracks are written by Darren Wharton, except where noted.

No.	Title	Writer(s)	Length
1.	"Wings of Fire"		5:00
2.	"We Don't Need a Reason"		3:38
3.	"Surrender"		3:40
4.	"Chains"	Wharton, Burns	4:04
5.	"Lies"	Wharton, Burns	4:43
6.	"Live to Fight Another Day"	Wharton, Burns	3:56
7.	"Cry Wolf"	Wharton, Burns	4:07
8.	"Breakout"	Wharton, Burns	4:09
9.	"Wild Heart"	Wharton, Burns	3:50
10.	"Real Love"		4:04

Japan bonus track
No.	Title	Length
11.	"Walk on the Water"	5:06

==== Calm Before the Storm (1998) ====
Track listing

All tracks are written by Darren Wharton, except where noted.

No.	Title	Writer(s)	Length
1.	"Walk on the Water"		6:53
2.	"Some Day"	Wharton, Richard Dews	4:45
3.	"Calm Before the Storm"		8:16
4.	"Rescue Me"	Wharton, Dews	5:19
5.	"Silence of Your Head"		6:26
6.	"Rising Sun"		4:08
7.	"Ashes"		6:01
8.	"Crown of Thorns"	Wharton, Dews	5:02
9.	"Deliverance"		4:23
10.	"Still in Love with You" (Thin Lizzy cover)	Phil Lynott	6:18

Japan bonus track
No.	Title	Length
11.	"Run to Me"	5:00

Reissue bonus track
No.	Title	Length
11.	"Cold Wind Will Blow"	5:03

==== Belief (2001) ====
Track listing

All tracks are written by Darren Wharton, except where noted.

No.	Title	Writer(s)	Length
1.	"Silent Thunder"		5:49
2.	"Dreams on Fire"		4:29
3.	"White Horses (Lions Heart)"		4:06
4.	"Belief"		6:07
5.	"Run Wild Run Free"		4:32
6.	"We Were Friends"		6:42
7.	"Falling"	Wharton, Dews	4:29
8.	"Where Will You Run To"		3:45
9.	"Take Me Away"		5:03
10.	"Promised Land"		4:47
11.	"Phoenix"	Wharton, Dews	4:14

==== Beneath the Shining Water (2004) ====
Track listing

All tracks are written by Darren Wharton, except where noted.

No.	Title	Writer(s)	Length
1.	"Sea of Roses"		4:37
2.	"Days Gone By"		4:13
3.	"Silent Hills"		4:00
4.	"Beneath the Shining Water"		4:49
5.	"The Battles That You've Won"		4:00
6.	"Allowed to Fall"		4:12
7.	"I'll Be the Wind"		3:59
8.	"Where Darkness Ends"		4:36
9.	"Storm Wind"		4:24
10.	"Last Train"	Wharton, Dews	4:17

Reissue bonus track
No.	Title	Length
11.	"Real Love" (re-recording)	4:02

==== Arc of the Dawn (2009) ====
Track listing

All tracks are written by Darren Wharton, except where noted.

No.	Title	Writer(s)	Length
1.	"Dublin"		5:15
2.	"Shelter in the Storm"		4:34
3.	"Follow the River"		3:36
4.	"King of Spades" (re-recording)		4:26
5.	"I Will Return" (re-recording of "Return the Heart")		4:44
6.	"Emerald" (Thin Lizzy cover)	Scott Gorham, Brian Robertson, Brian Downey, Lynott	4:38
7.	"When"	Wharton, Dews	4:34
8.	"The Flame" (Cheap Trick cover)	Bob Mitchell, Nick Graham	4:37
9.	"Still Waiting"		4:20
10.	"Kiss the Rain"	Wharton, Dews	4:14
11.	"Remember"		5:04
12.	"Circles"		4:11

==== Calm Before the Storm 2 (2012) ====
Track listing

All tracks are written by Darren Wharton, except where noted.

No.	Title	Writer(s)	Length
1.	"Walk on the Water"		6:42
2.	"Someday"	Wharton, Dews	4:13
3.	"Calm Before the Storm"		6:40
4.	"Crown of Thorns"	Wharton, Dews	5:00
5.	"Precious"	Wharton, Burns	4:22
6.	"Silence of Your Head"		5:21
7.	"Rescue Me"	Wharton, Dews	4:40
8.	"Ashes"	Wharton, Dews	5:08
9.	"Rising Sun"		3:49
10.	"Cold Wind Will Blow"		4:31
11.	"Deliverance"		3:39

==== Sacred Ground (2016) ====
Track listing

All tracks are written by Darren Wharton.

No.	Title	Length
1.	"Home"	4:44
2.	"I'll Hear You Pray"	4:20
3.	"Strength"	4:16
4.	"Every Time We Say Goodbye"	4:01
5.	"Days of Summer"	3:44
6.	"On My Own"	3:15
7.	"Until"	3:58
8.	"All Our Brass Was Gold"	3:48
9.	"You Carried Me"	4:11
10.	"Like the First Time"	4:18
11.	"Along the Heather"	4:01

==== Out of the Silence II (2018) ====
Track listing

All tracks are written by Darren Wharton, except where noted.

No.	Title	Writer(s)	Length
1.	"Abandon"	Wharton, Burns	4:50
2.	"Into the Fire"		4:43
3.	"Nothing Is Stronger Than Love"	Wharton, Burns	5:06
4.	"Runaway"		4:38
5.	"Under the Sun"		5:55
6.	"The Raindance"		5:03
7.	"King of Spades" (extended version)		6:30
8.	"Heartbreaker"	Wharton, Burns	3:40
9.	"Return the Heart"		4:54
10.	"Don't Let Go"	Wharton, Burns	6:23

==== Road to Eden (2022) ====
Track listing

All tracks are written by Darren Wharton.

No.	Title	Length
1.	"Born in the Storm"	4:44
2.	"Cradle to the Grave"	4:21
3.	"Fire Never Fades"	3:51
4.	"Road to Eden"	4:07
5.	"Lovers and Friends"	3:43
6.	"Only the Good Die Young"	4:37
7.	"I Always Will"	4:24
8.	"Grace"	3:44
9.	"The Devil Rides Tonight"	3:49
10.	"Thy Kingdom Come"	4:30

==== The Best Of Dare (2025) ====
Track listing CD1

No.	Title	Length
1.	"Home"
2.	"Born In The Storm"
3.	"Dublin"
4.	"Sea Of Roses"
5.	"I'll Hear You Pray"
6.	"Cradle To The Grave"
7.	"Every Time We Say Goodbye"
8.	"Silent Hills"
9.	"Until"
10.	"Remember"
11.	"Emerald"
12.	"Road To Eden"
13.	"Lovers and Friends"
14.	"The Battles That You've Won"
15.	"Beneath The Shining Water"
16.	"Strength"
17.	"Where Darkness Ends"
18.	"Circles"

Track listing CD2

No.	Title	Length
1.	"Walk on the Water"
2.	"Abandon"
3.	"Into the Fire"
4.	"Wings of Fire"
5.	"We Don't Need a Reason"
6.	"Silent Thunder"
7.	"White Horses"
8.	"Days of Summer"
9.	"I Will Return"
10.	"King of Spades"
11.	"Chains"
12.	"Still Waiting"
13.	"We Were Friends"
14.	"Heartbreaker"
15.	"Under the Sun"
16.	"The Raindance"

=== Live albums ===
==== The Power of Nature: Live in Munich (2005) ====
Track listing

All tracks are written by Darren Wharton. The track listing on the packaging is incorrect. For instance, it lists 10 tracks when in fact there are 11 on the disc. Several tracks are also incorrectly named. The track listing below reflects the actual content.

No.	Title	Writer(s)	Length
1.	"Sea of Roses"		4:47
2.	"Storm Wind"		5:04
3.	"Where Darkness Ends"		4:43
4.	"Silent Hills"		4:22
5.	"Some Day"	Wharton, Dews	5:48
6.	"Silent Thunder"		6:19
7.	"Abandon"	Wharton, Burns	5:24
8.	"Into the Fire"		5:22
9.	"Return the Heart"		5:53
10.	"King of Spades"		5:41
11.	"White Horses"		5:19
