= Forces of Nature (TV series) =

TV series with Brian Cox

- Genre: Documentary series
- Presented by: Brian Cox
- Composer: Benji Merrison
- Country of origin: United Kingdom
- No. of episodes: 4

Production
- Executive producer: Andrew Cohen
- Running time: 60 minutes
- Production companies: BBC Studios; PBS; France Télévisions

Original release
- Network: BBC One; BBC One HD
- Release: 4 July – 25 July 2016

Related
- Human Universe (2014)

Forces of Nature is a four-part television documentary series presented by physicist Brian Cox. The series was co-produced by BBC Studios, PBS and France Télévisions and originally aired in the United Kingdom weekly from 4 July 2016 at 21:00 on BBC One.

The documentary series couples high-definition cinematography with calm and methodical narration, uncovering how some of our planet's most beautiful sights and events are created by the underlying forces of nature. It follows on from Brian's 2014 series for the BBC, Human Universe. An accompanying book with the same name, by Cox and Andrew Cohen, has also been published.

The US version does not feature Brian Cox.

== Episodes ==
The natural world is beautiful, but complex. The skies dance with colour. Shapes form and disappear. But this seemingly infinite complexity is just a shadow of something deeper – the underlying laws of nature. The world is beautiful to look at, but it is even more beautiful to understand.

— Professor Brian Cox's opening narration

No. (UK)	No. (US)	Original title PBS title	Original release date (UK)	Original release date (US)
1	1	"The Universe in a Snowflake" "Shape"	4 July 2016	14 September 2016
The opener of the series illuminates how the stunning diversity of shapes in our world are forged by just a handful of natural forces. The episode sets off in Penedès, Spain, featuring castells, which are human towers built in festivals in Catalonia. Brian narrates how a symmetrical shape enables the participants of the Catalan festival to build a human tower as high as possible. Then, the programme brings to fore the perilous honey hunting practiced in the lower slopes of Annapurna in Nepal to explain – through the Honeycomb conjecture – the unmatchable efficiency of hexagonal structures bees build to store honey. Finally, Brian demonstrates how all of the fundamental physics that describe the universe – gravity, electromagnetism, nuclear force, and symmetry – can be observed in the falling and structure of a snowflake.
2	4	"Somewhere in Spacetime" "Motion"	11 July 2016	5 October 2016
In the second episode, Brian considers the nature of motion and explores how the celestial clockwork of the Sun and the Earth-Moon system account for a wide range of natural phenomena observed on Earth, from tropical cyclones and tidal waves to sunrises and seasonal changes. The episode begins in Warton Aerodrome in England with Brian taking to the air in a Eurofighter Typhoon, in an attempt to "beat the Earth's rotation and reverse the passage of the day." In Tacloban, Philippines, Brian narrates how the Coriolis force (caused by the Earth's rotation) and the warmth of the tropical waters conspire to give rise to some of the deadliest storms in the world, like Typhoon Haiyan that hit the country in 2013. Then, in Amapá, Brazil, he relates how the complex gravitational interaction between the Sun and the Moon are not just responsive for the gentle and familiar rise and fall of tides, but also for monstrous tidal bores, like the Pororoca on the waters of the Amazon. Towards the end, he lays out photographs from different points in his life – as a baby, getting married, with his own son, etc. – and concludes by stating that "if Einstein is right, then the past events we remember and our unforeseen future are all out there, somewhere in spacetime."
3	2	"The Moth and the Flame" "Elements"	18 July 2016	21 September 2016
The third part provides an overview of how Earth's basic ingredients have become the building blocks of life.
4	3	"The Pale Blue Dot" "Colour"	25 July 2016	28 September 2016
The final episode sees Brian reveal the colour signature of our life-supporting planet.

Forces of Nature (UK) book cover
