= Michael Garrett (astronomer) =

Scottish astronomer

Michael (Mike) Garrett FRS (born 1964) is a Scottish astronomer. He has been the Director of Jodrell Bank Centre for Astrophysics since September 2016. He was previously the General Director of ASTRON, part of the Netherlands Organisation for Scientific Research.

== Personal life ==
He was born in Kilwinning, North Ayrshire, Scotland, and brought up in nearby Saltcoats, on the west coast.

== Education ==
He went to St. Mary's (1969–1976) and St. Andrew's RC schools (1976–1982). He graduated with first-class honours at the University of Glasgow (1982–1986). He studied for his PhD at Jodrell Bank Observatory, University of Manchester (1986–1990), supervised by Dennis Walsh.

== Career ==
Garrett started work at the Joint Institute for VLBI in Europe (JIVE) in 1996, working on support for the European VLBI Network. He became the director of JIVE in 2003, and over the course of his four-year tenure the number of employees at the institute doubled from 20 to 40. On 1 February 2007 he became the General Director of ASTRON, part of the Netherlands Organisation for Scientific Research. He was one of 14 winners of the 2013 IBM Faculty Award. He became the inaugural Sir Bernard Lovell Chair of Astrophysics and the Director of Jodrell Bank Centre for Astrophysics in September 2016.

He was elected a member of the Academia Europaea in 2021 and a Fellow of the Royal Society in 2024.
