= Wonders of Life (TV series) =

2013 British television series

- Wonders of Life titlecard
- Genre: Documentary series
- Presented by: Brian Cox
- Country of origin: United Kingdom
- Original language: English
- No. of series: 1
- No. of episodes: 5

Production
- Executive producer: Andrew Cohen
- Running time: 60 minutes

Original release
- Network: BBC Two; BBC HD
- Release: 27 January – 24 February 2013

Related
- Wonders of the Universe (2011); Human Universe (2014)

Wonders of Life is a 2013 television documentary series presented by physicist Brian Cox. The series was produced by the BBC and Chinese state television network CCTV-9 and aired in the United Kingdom from 27 January 2013 at 9:00 pm on BBC Two. An accompanying book with the same title was also published.

== Episodes ==
=== 1. "What is Life?" ===
Brian Cox journeys to Southeast Asia to see how life began on Earth and how the flow of energy created and supports life.

=== 2. "Expanding Universe" ===
In the second episode, Brian travels to the U.S. to showcase how the laws of science allowed senses to arise.

=== 3. "Endless Forms Most Beautiful" ===
Brian travels to Africa and Madagascar to analyse why Earth is a fertile place and how it allows complex life to exist.

=== 4. "Size Matters" ===
The fourth episode sees Brian in Australia, looking at how the size of each plant and animal affects how long it can survive.

=== 5. "Home" ===
In the final episode, Cox travels to Mexico to explain what makes Earth a home for life and ask what ingredients were required for complex life to begin.

== Merchandise ==
The Region 2 DVD discs were released on 4 March 2013.

A book related to the series was authored by Andrew Cohen and Brian Cox. The book was published on 24 January 2013.
