= Frozen mirror image method =

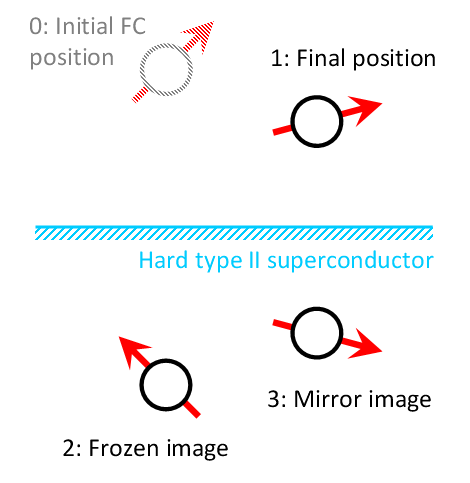
Fig. 1. Illustration of the frozen mirror image method for a simplest case of the magnetic dipole over the flat superconducting surface.

Frozen mirror image method (or method of frozen images) is an extension of the method of images for magnet-superconductor systems that has been introduced by Alexander Kordyuk in 1998 to take into account the magnetic flux pinning phenomenon. The method gives a simple representation of the magnetic field distribution generated by a magnet (a system of magnets) outside an infinitely flat surface of a perfectly hard (with infinite pinning force) type-II superconductor in more general field cooled (FC) case, i.e. when the superconductor goes into its superconducting state under the influence of an external magnetic field. The difference from the mirror image method, which deals with a perfect type-I superconductor (that completely expels the magnetic field, see the Meissner effect), is that the perfectly hard superconductor screens the variation of the external magnetic field rather than the field itself.

== Description ==
The name originates from the replacement of certain elements in the original layout with imaginary magnets, which replicates the boundary conditions of the problem (see Dirichlet boundary conditions). In a simplest case of the magnetic dipole over the flat superconducting surface (see Fig. 1), the magnetic field, generated by a dipole moved from its initial position (at which the superconductor is cooled to the superconducting state) to a final position and by the screening currents at the superconducting surface, is equivalent to the field of three magnetic dipoles: the real one (1), its mirror image (3), and the mirror image of it in initial (FC) position but with the magnetization vector inversed (2).

== Applications ==
The method is shown to work for the bulk high temperature superconductors (HTSC), which are characterized by strong pinning and used for calculation of the interaction in magnet-HTSC systems such as superconducting magnetic bearings, superconducting flywheels, MAGLEV, for spacecraft applications, as well as a textbook model for science education.

== See also ==
- Method of images
- Ideally hard superconductor
- Magnetic levitation
- Bean's critical state model
- High temperature superconductors

== Demos ==
- Superconducting levitation with strong pinning
- Magnetic levitation (YouTube)
