= Levitation (physics) =

Holding aloft without mechanical support

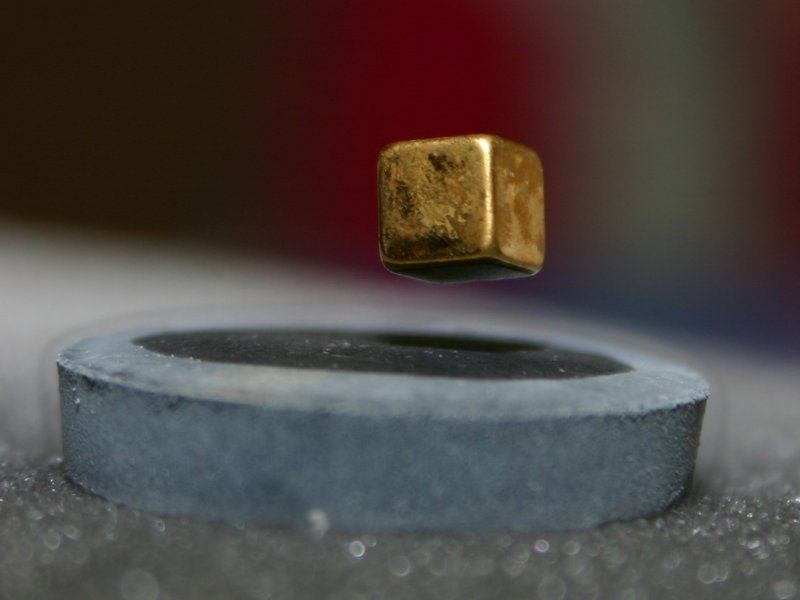
A cube magnet levitating over a superconducting material (known as the Meissner effect)

Levitation (from Latin levitas, lit. 'lightness') is the process by which an object is held aloft in a stable position, without mechanical support via any physical contact.

Levitation is accomplished by providing an upward force that counteracts the pull of gravity (in relation to gravity on earth), plus a smaller stabilizing force that pushes the object toward a home position whenever it is a small distance away from that home position. The force can be a fundamental force such as magnetic or electrostatic, or it can be a reactive force such as optical, buoyant, aerodynamic, or hydrodynamic. Levitation excludes floating at the surface of a liquid because the liquid provides direct mechanical support. Levitation excludes hovering flight by insects, hummingbirds, helicopters, rockets, and balloons because the object provides its own counter-gravity force.

== Physics ==
Levitation (on Earth or any other planet) requires an upward force that cancels out the weight of the object, so that the object does not fall (accelerate downward) or rise (accelerate upward). For positional stability, any small displacement of the levitating object must result in a small change in force in the opposite direction. The small changes in force can be accomplished by gradient field(s) or by active regulation. If the object is disturbed, it might oscillate around its final position, but its motion eventually decreases to zero due to damping effects. (In a turbulent flow, the object might oscillate indefinitely.)

Levitation techniques are useful tools in physics research. For example, levitation methods are useful for high-temperature melt property studies because they eliminate the problem of reaction with containers and allow deep undercooling of melts. The containerless conditions may be obtained by opposing gravity with a levitation force instead of allowing an entire experiment to freefall.

== Magnetic levitation ==
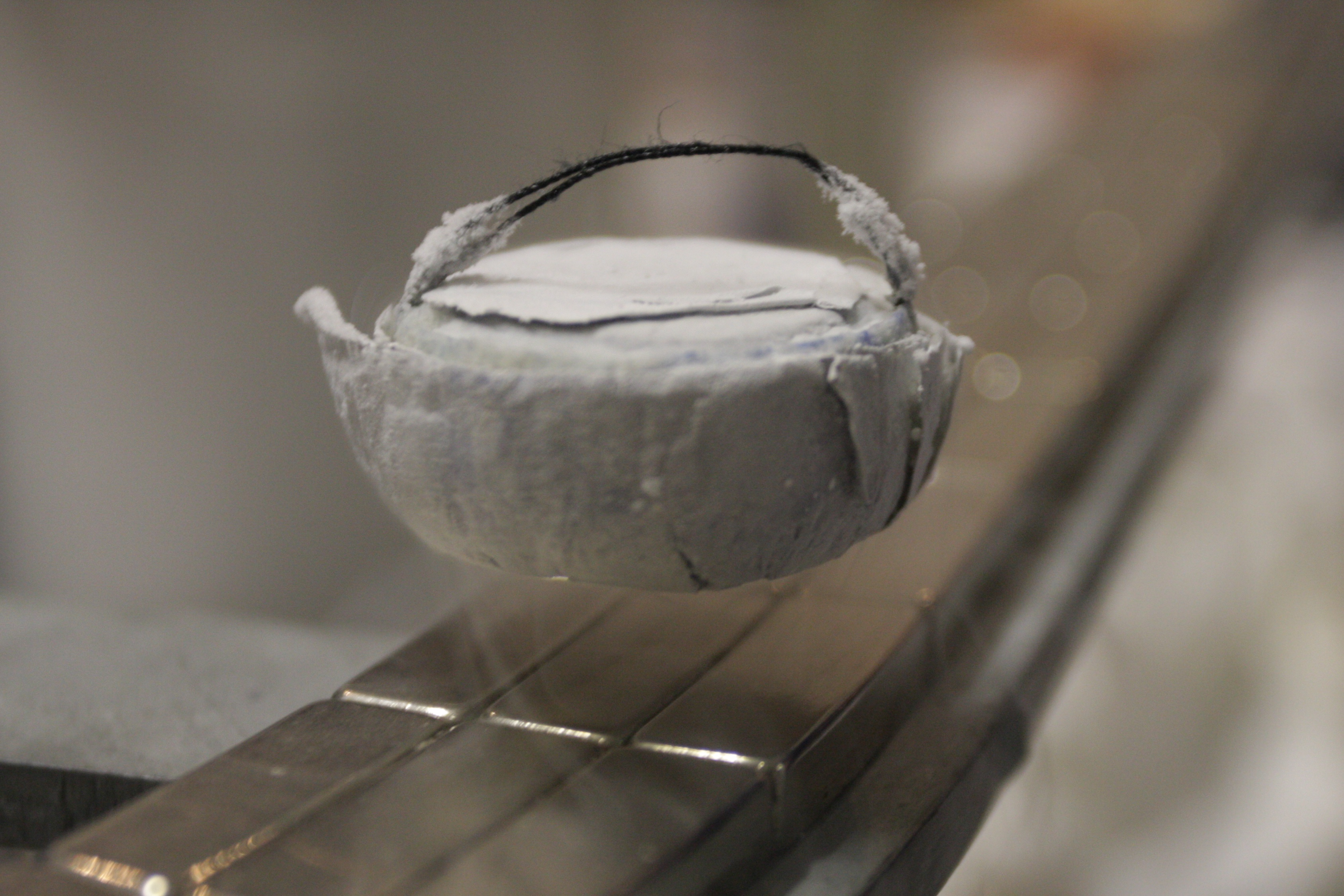
A high-temperature superconductor levitating above magnet

Magnetic levitation is the most commonly seen and used form of levitation. This form of levitation occurs when an object is suspended using magnetic fields.

Diamagnetic materials are commonly used for demonstration purposes. In this case the returning force appears from the interaction with the screening currents. For example, a superconducting sample, which can be considered either as a perfect diamagnet or an ideally hard superconductor, easily levitates in an ambient external magnetic field. The superconductor is cooled with liquid nitrogen to levitate on top of a magnet becoming super diamagnetic. In a powerful magnetic field utilizing diamagnetic levitation, even small live animals have been levitated.

It is possible to levitate pyrolytic graphite by placing thin squares of it above four cube magnets with the north poles forming one diagonal and south poles forming the other diagonal. Researchers have even successfully levitated (non-magnetic) liquid droplets surrounded by paramagnetic fluids. The process of such inverse magnetic levitation is usually referred to as Magneto-Archimedes effect.

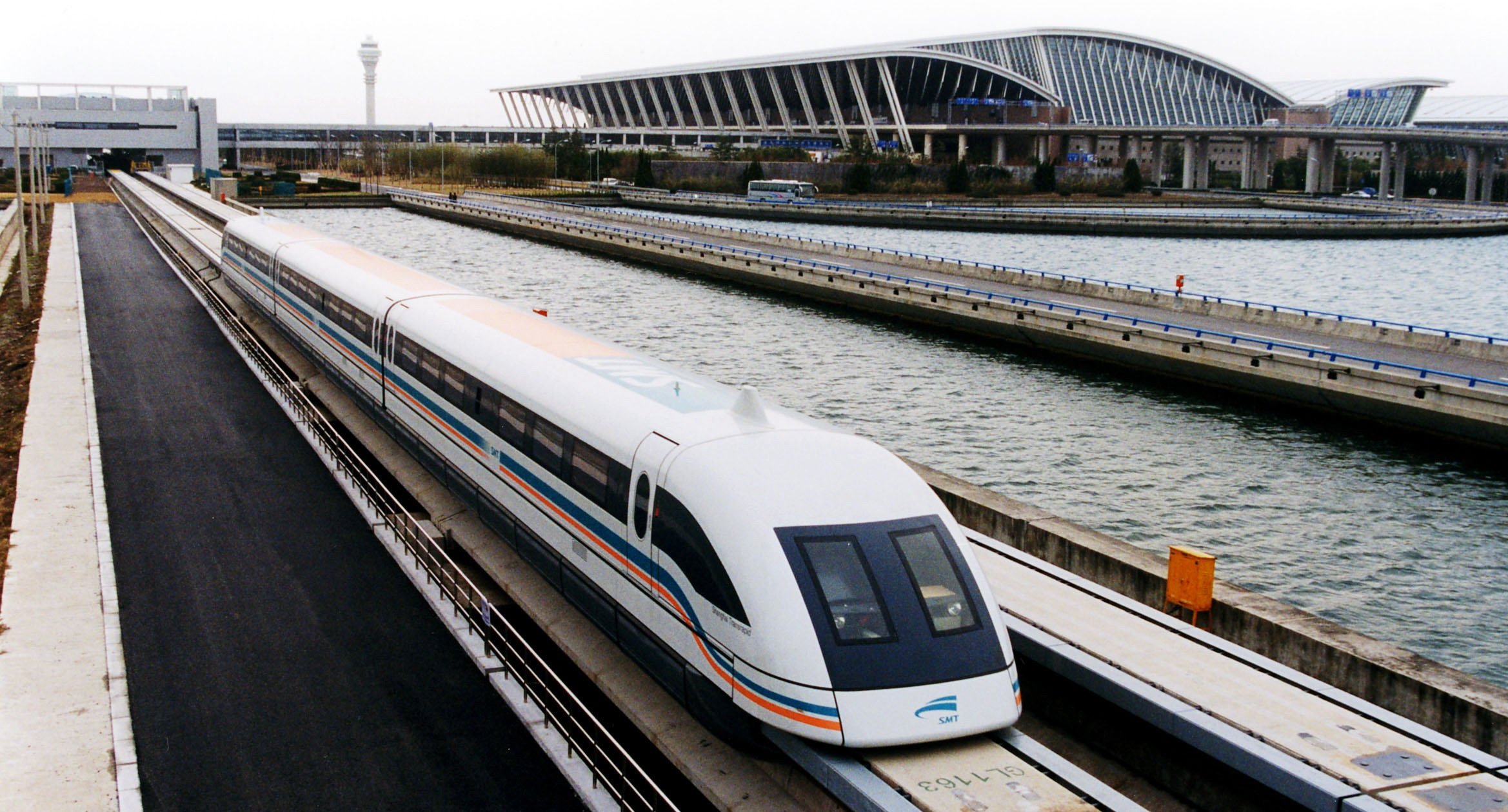
A magnetically levitated (maglev) train departing Shanghai Pudong International Airport on the first commercial high-speed maglev line in the world

Magnetic levitation is in development for use for transportation systems. For example, the maglev includes trains that are levitated by a large number of magnets. Due to the lack of friction on the guide rails, they are faster, quieter, and smoother than wheeled mass transit systems.

Electrodynamic suspension uses AC magnetic fields.

== Electrostatic levitation ==
In electrostatic levitation an electric field is used to counteract gravitational force.

== Aerodynamic levitation ==
In aerodynamic levitation, the levitation is achieved by floating the object on a stream of gas, either produced by the object or acting on the object. For example, a ping pong ball can be levitated with the stream of air from a vacuum cleaner set on "blow"— exploiting the Coandă effect which keeps it stable in the airstream. With enough thrust, very large objects can be levitated using this method.

=== Gas film levitation ===
This technique enables the levitation of an object against gravitational force by floating it on a thin gas film formed by gas flow through a porous membrane. Using this technique, high temperature melts can be kept clean from contamination and be supercooled. A common example in general usage includes air hockey, where the puck is lifted by a thin layer of air. Hovercraft also use this technique, producing a large region of high-pressure air underneath them.

== Acoustic levitation ==
Acoustic levitation uses sound waves to provide a levitating force.

== Optical levitation ==
Optical levitation is a technique in which a material is levitated against the downward force of gravity by an upward force stemming from photon momentum transfer (radiation pressure).

== Buoyant levitation ==
Gases at high pressure can have a density exceeding that of some solids. Thus they can be used to levitate solid objects through buoyancy. Noble gases are preferred for their non-reactivity. Xenon is the densest non-radioactive noble gas, at 5.894g/L. Xenon has been used to levitate polyethylene, at a pressure of 154 atmospheres.

== Casimir force ==
Ultra-small objects can be levitated by manipulating the Casimir force, which normally causes objects to stick together due to forces predicted by quantum field theory. This is, however, only possible for micro-objects.

== Uses ==
=== Maglev trains ===
Magnetic levitation is used to suspend trains without touching the track. This permits very high speeds, and greatly reduces the maintenance requirements for tracks and vehicles, as little wear occurs. This also means there is no friction, so the only force acting against it is air resistance.

=== Animal levitation ===
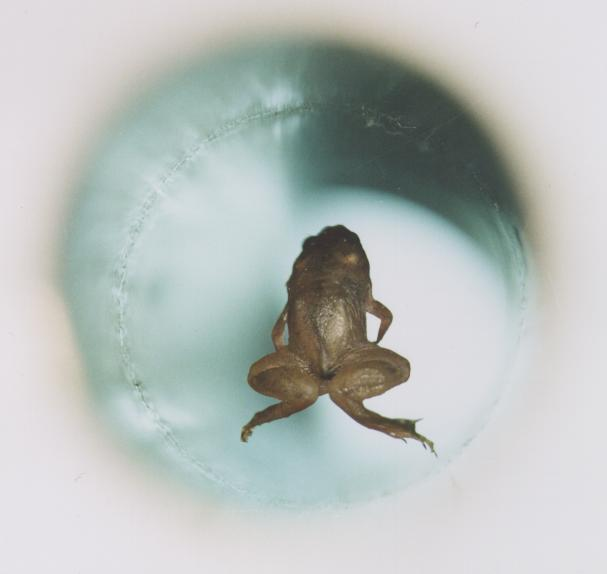
Diamagnetic levitation of a live frog

Scientists have levitated frogs, grasshoppers, and mice by means of powerful electromagnets utilizing superconductors, producing diamagnetic repulsion of body water. The mice acted confused at first, but adapted to the levitation after approximately four hours, suffering no immediate ill effects.

== See also ==
- Levitation (illusion)
- Levitation based inertial sensing
- Anti-gravity
- Flight
- Leidenfrost effect
- Telekinesis
- Weightlessness
