= Kopylov =

Kopylov (Russian: Копылов) and Kopylova (Russian: Копылова; feminine) is a common Russian surname.

It may refer to:

People

- Abbakum Kopylov (1756–1838), founder of the postniki sect
- Alexander Kopylov (1854–1911), Russian composer and violinist
- Andrei Kopylov, mixed martial arts fighter
- Andrei Nikolayevich Kopylov (born 1972), Russian footballer
- Nikolai Georgiyevich Kopilov (1919–1995), a Russian chess player
- Ivan Kopylov (1928–2000), Soviet astronomer, the director of the Special Astrophysical Observatory in 1966–1985
- Roman Kopylov, Russian mixed martial artist
- Sergei Kopylov (born 1960), Soviet cyclist
- Vadym Kopylov (born 1958), Ukrainian statesman
- Vladimir Kopylov (1947–2006), Soviet and Russian physicist
- Lilia Kopylova (born 1978), English professional dancer

Places

- Kopylov (village), a village (khutor) in Saratov Oblast, Russia
- Kopylova (village), a village in Tyumen Oblast, Russia

== See also ==
- 9932 Kopylov, a main belt asteroid named after Ivan Kopylov
