= Forest Stream =

Russian metal band

- Origin: Chernogolovka, Russia
- Genres: Symphonic black metal Doom metal Gothic metal
- Years active: 1995–present
- Labels: Earache Records; Candlelight Records
- Members: Sonm the Darkest; Stone R Wizard Omin; Elhella; Berserk; Kir
- Website: www.forest-stream.com

Forest Stream is a symphonic black / doom / gothic metal band formed in Chernogolovka, Russia in 1995. The band draws inspiration from Russian winters. The band combines 1990s British doom metal and Norwegian black metal. The lyrics deal with sorrow and hopelessness. Their first album, Tears of Mortal Solitude, was released in early 2003, and was warmly received by critics. In May 2007, the band went on their first international tour in Ukraine. In September 2007, the band signed to Candlelight Records and recorded their second album, The Crown of Winter. The band are believed to be unsigned.

== Members ==
- Sonm the Darkest – vocals
- Wizard Omin – guitars
- Stone R – bass
- Berserk – guitars
- Elhella – keyboards
- Kir – drums

== Discography ==
=== Albums ===
- Tears of Mortal Solitude (2003)
- The Crown of Winter (2009)

=== Demos ===
- Snowfall (1999)
- Last Season Purity (2001)
