= Vladimir Kopylov =

Russian physicist

- Владимир Николаевич Копылов
- Born: December 2, 1947; Leningrad, Soviet Union
- Died: February 18, 2006 (aged 58); Chernogolovka, near Moscow
- Education: Moscow Institute of Physics and Technology
- Known for: Meissner effect in high-T_{c} superconductors
- Scientific career
- Fields: Solid-state physics
- Workplaces: Institute of Solid State Physics

Vladimir N. Kopylov (Russian: Владимир Николаевич Копылов) was a Russian physicist.

Most of his career he worked in the Institute of Solid State Physics in Chernogolovka, near Moscow.

He received the highest honor for young scientists in the USSR, the Komsomol prize, for his discovery of thermomagnetic and galvanomagnetic waves, which can propagate in metals.

== Education ==
Kopylov graduated from Moscow Institute of Physics and Technology in 1970, specialising in Radiophysics and Electronics.

== Career ==
Authoring many papers, his work in collaboration with I. F. Scgegolev and others led to understanding of the Meissner effect in high-T_{c} superconductors through the surface barrier effect, also known as the Bean–Livingston barrier.
