= Alexander Kordyuk =

Alexander A. Kordyuk
- Born: 9 December 1967 (age 58); Kyiv
- Education: Moscow Institute of Physics and Technology
- Known for: Method of frozen images
- Scientific career
- Fields: Condensed matter, Superconductivity
- Workplaces: Institute of Metal Physics
- Website: http://www.imp.kiev.ua/~kord

Alexander A. Kordyuk (born December 9, 1967) is a Ukrainian experimental physicist, known mainly for invention of the Method of frozen images and several experimental techniques based on magnetic levitation, and for contribution to the field of high temperature superconductivity.

Born in Kyiv, Ukraine, Alexander Kordyuk graduated from Moscow Institute of Physics and Technology (MIPT) in 1991, PhD in solid state physics in 1994 and habilitated (DSc in superconductivity) in 2000. Since 2001 he is working at the Institute of Metal Physics, Kyiv, Ukraine, as leading scientist, and since 2012 as head of department of superconductivity. Since 2006, Professor at the Taras Shevchenko National University of Kyiv. Worked as guest scientist at the IFW Dresden, IPHT Jena, and University of Amsterdam, as visiting professor at the University of Wollongong. Since 2012, corresponding member of the National Academy of Sciences of Ukraine.

As of January 2013, Kordyuk authored over 100 scientific papers, h-index = 28.
