= Wilfried Kurz =

Austrian-Swiss materials scientist

- Born: 1938 (age 87–88); Leoben, Styria, Austria
- Citizenship: Austria; Switzerland
- Education: University of Leoben
- Occupation: Academic
- Known for: Theory of solidification; Microstructure formation
- Scientific career
- Fields: Materials science; Physical metallurgy
- Workplaces: Battelle Geneva Research Laboratories; École Polytechnique Fédérale de Lausanne

Wilfried Kurz is an Austrian‑Swiss academic who is Professor Emeritus of Materials Science and Engineering at the École Polytechnique Fédérale de Lausanne (EPFL), Switzerland.

== Early life and education ==
Wilfried Kurz was born in 1938 in Leoben, Styria, Austria. He received his doctorate from the Montanuniversität Leoben, advised by Roland Mitsche, and published his thesis Ultrasonic Localization of the Solid‑Liquid Interface in Metals in 1968.

== Career ==
Kurz joined the Battelle Geneva Research Laboratories in 1964, where he led the physical metallurgy group until 1971. Later that year he was appointed associate professor at the Department of Materials at EPFL and, in 1974, full professor of Physical metallurgy. He directed the Laboratory of Physical Metallurgy and the Laser Materials Processing Centre until his statutory retirement in 2003.

In 1974 Kurz helped create Switzerland’s first materials‑science degree programme at EPFL. He later served twice as Head of Department and, from 2001 to 2005, chaired EPFL’s Tenure Track Committee.

Kurz also worked to strengthen European collaboration in materials research. He chaired the management committee of the COST Advanced Solidification and Casting Technology programme for industry software development. In 1999 he joined the executive committee of the Federation of European Materials Societies (FEMS) and served as FEMS president from 2004 to 2005. In 2003 he chaired the EUROMAT congress in Lausanne.

From 2009 to 2017 Kurz sat on the Board of Governors of Acta Materialia Inc. He has also served on advisory committees of the Montanuniversität Leoben and the Max‑Planck‑Institute for Iron Research in Düsseldorf, Germany. Germany. Further he participated in the development of Materials Science and Engineering at the new (2004) Cyprus University of Technology (CUT) at Limassol.

== Research ==
Kurz’s research elucidates the growth of microstructures, combining experiment and theory. He has examined dendritic, peritectic and eutectic solidification, micro‑segregation and solid‑state transformation kinetics, collaborating closely with Rohit Trivedi of Iowa State University.

He has also investigated solidification‑processing techniques including continuous casting of steel, welding, laser treatment, rapid solidification, single‑crystal casting, directional solidification and epitaxial single‑crystal laser repair. His work underpins microstructure modelling in additive manufacturing.

== Awards and recognition ==
- Bruce Chalmers Award of The Minerals, Metals and Materials Society, USA
- European Materials Medal of FEMS
- Médaille Bastien Guillet, Société Française de Métallurgie et des Matériaux (SF2M), France
- ISI Highly Cited Researcher
- Heyn Memorial Medal of the German Society for Materials Science
- Luigi Losana Gold Medal of the Associazione Italiana di Metallurgia
- Albert Sauveur Achievement Award of ASM International
- John Hunt Medal, IoM3 – The Institute of Materials, Minerals and Mining, London
- Visiting professor at Brunel University London
- Honorary Member, Iron and Steel Institute of Japan
- Corresponding member, Austrian Academy of Sciences

== Selected publications ==
- Trivedi, R.; Kurz, W. (January 1994). "Dendritic growth". International Materials Reviews. 39 (2): 49–74. doi:10.1179/imr.1994.39.2.49.
- Gäumann, M.; Bezençon, C.; Canalis, P.; Kurz, W. (April 2001). "Single-crystal laser deposition of superalloys: processing–microstructure maps". Acta Materialia. 49 (6): 1051–1062. doi:10.1016/S1359-6454(00)00367-0.
- Kurz, W. (July 2001). "Solidification Microstructure-Processing Maps: Theory and Application". Advanced Engineering Materials. 3 (7): 443–452. doi:10.1002/1527-2648(200107)3:7<443::AID-ADEM443>3.0.CO;2-W.
- Lima, Milton; Kurz, Wilfried (August 2002). "Massive transformation and absolute stability". Metallurgical and Materials Transactions A. 33 (8): 2337–2345. doi:10.1007/s11661-002-0357-1.
- Dobler, S; Lo, T.S; Plapp, M; Karma, A; Kurz, W (May 2004). "Peritectic coupled growth". Acta Materialia. 52 (9): 2795–2808. doi:10.1016/j.actamat.2004.02.026.
- Wang, N; Mokadem, S; Rappaz, M; Kurz, W (June 2004). "Solidification cracking of superalloy single- and bi-crystals". Acta Materialia. 52 (11): 3173–3182. doi:10.1016/j.actamat.2004.03.047.
- Kurz, Wilfried; Fisher, David J.; Trivedi, Rohit (18 August 2019). "Progress in modelling solidification microstructures in metals and alloys: dendrites and cells from 1700 to 2000". International Materials Reviews. 64 (6): 311–354. doi:10.1080/09506608.2018.1537090.
- Kurz, Wilfried; Rappaz, Michel; Trivedi, Rohit (2 January 2021). "Progress in modelling solidification microstructures in metals and alloys. Part II: dendrites from 2001 to 2018". International Materials Reviews. 66 (1): 30–76. doi:10.1080/09506608.2020.1757894.

== Books ==
- Kurz, Wilfried; Sahm, P.R. (1975). Gerichtet erstarrte eutektische Werkstoffe, Springer, Berlin 345 pp.
- Mercier, Jean-Pierre ; Kurz, W.; Zambelli, G. (2002). Introduction à la Science des Matériaux, 3ème édition, PPUR, Switzerland 497 pp.
- Kurz, Wilfried; Fisher, D.J.; Rappaz, M. (2023). Fundamentals of Solidification. 5th revised edition, Trans Tech Publications, Switzerland 359 pp.
- Kurz, Wilfried; Fisher, D.J.; Rappaz, M. (2023). Fundamentals of Solidification – Solutions Manual, Trans Tech Publications, Switzerland 84 pp.
