= Yuri Osipyan =

Youri Osipyan
- Born: 15 February, 1931; Moscow, USSR
- Died: 10 September, 2008; Moscow, Russia
- Awards: Hero of Socialist Labour; Order of Lenin, twice Order of the Red Banner of Labour, twice Medal of 100th Anniversary of Lenin; Medal "For Strengthening of Brotherhood in Arms"; Legion of Honour (Cavalier)
- Scientific career
- Fields: Physics

Yuri Andreyevich Osipyan (Russian: Юрий Андреевич Осипьян; February 15, 1931 – September 10, 2008) was a Soviet, Russian-Armenian physicist who worked in the field of solid-state physics.

Osipyan was born in Moscow and graduated from Georgy Kurdyumov's class at Moscow Institute of Steel and Alloys in 1955. Later, he summarized his interest in science: in late 1950s and 1960s, Osipyan worked on the extended effects of interaction of electrons with solid matter and discovered the effect of optical excitation of plastic properties in semiconductors. Also in 1960s Osipyan released his theory of dislocations in semiconductor crystal structure.

In 1962 Osipyan became a cofounder and director of the Institute of Solid State Physics in Chernogolovka and remained at the head of the Institute until his death. Osipyan was elected full member of Russian Academy of Sciences at the age of 37, and vice-president of the Academy in 1988—2001. He chaired the Departments of Solid State physics at Moscow State University and Moscow Institute of Physics and Technology.

In 1980s Osipyan and his Institute conducted microgravity experiments on board of Mir station. In 2000s Osipyan engaged in the studies of fullerens.

Throughout his lifetime Osipyan chaired numerous academic commissions, conferences and journal boards. From 1990 to 1993 he was president of the International Union of Pure and Applied Physics (IUPAP). In 2005 he was awarded Lomonosov Gold Medal of the Russian Academy. In an interview the year after, Osipyan summarized his creed in science: "All my life I was mining for experimental data. I am an experimenter, although I was trained in theory. In the Soviet age, creative and (most important) independent work was possible only in science. May I say that my choice was based on a will for freedom and independence."
