= Tears of Mortal Solitude =

Studio album by Forest Stream
- Released: January 27, 2003
- Recorded: June 2002 at S&O Home Studio in Chernogolovka
- Genre: Symphonic black metal Doom metal Gothic metal
- Length: 68:48
- Label: Earache Records
- Producer: Forest Stream

Forest Stream chronology
Last Season Purity (2001)	Tears of Mortal Solitude (2003)	The Crown of Winter (2009)

Tears of Mortal Solitude is the first full-length album by the Russian symphonic black / doom / Gothic metal band Forest Stream. It was released on January 27, 2003 through Earache Records.

The album was rated an 8 out of 10 by Chronicles of Chaos.

== Track listing ==
1. "Autumn Elegy" – 3:52
2. "Legend" – 8:07
3. "Last Season Purity" – 12:15
4. "Snowfall" – 9:55
5. "Mel Kor" – 8:50
6. "Whole" – 5:15
7. "Black Swans" – 10:33
8. "Winter Solstice" – 8:27
9. "Steps of Mankind" – 1:34

== Personnel ==
- Sonm the Darkest – vocals
- Wizard Omin – guitars
- Berserk – guitars
- Anth – bass
- Anate – keyboards
- Elhella – drums
