= Ideally hard superconductor =

Superconductor with infinite pinning force

An ideally hard superconductor is a type II superconductor material with an infinite pinning force. In the external magnetic field it behaves like an ideal diamagnet if the field is switched on when the material is in the superconducting state, so-called "zero field cooled" (ZFC) regime. In the field cooled (FC) regime, the ideally hard superconductor screens perfectly the change of the magnetic field rather than the magnetic field itself. Its magnetization behavior can be described by Bean's critical state model.

The ideally hard superconductor is a good approximation for the melt-textured high temperature superconductors (HTSC) used in large scale HTSC applications such as flywheels, HTSC bearings, HTSC motors, etc.

== See also ==
- Frozen mirror image method
- Bean's critical state model
