= Bean–Livingston barrier =

An Abrikosov vortex near the boundary of a superconductor creates an effective image antivortex on the opposite side of the boundary. The attraction between these vortices makes up one half of the Bean–Livingston barrier.

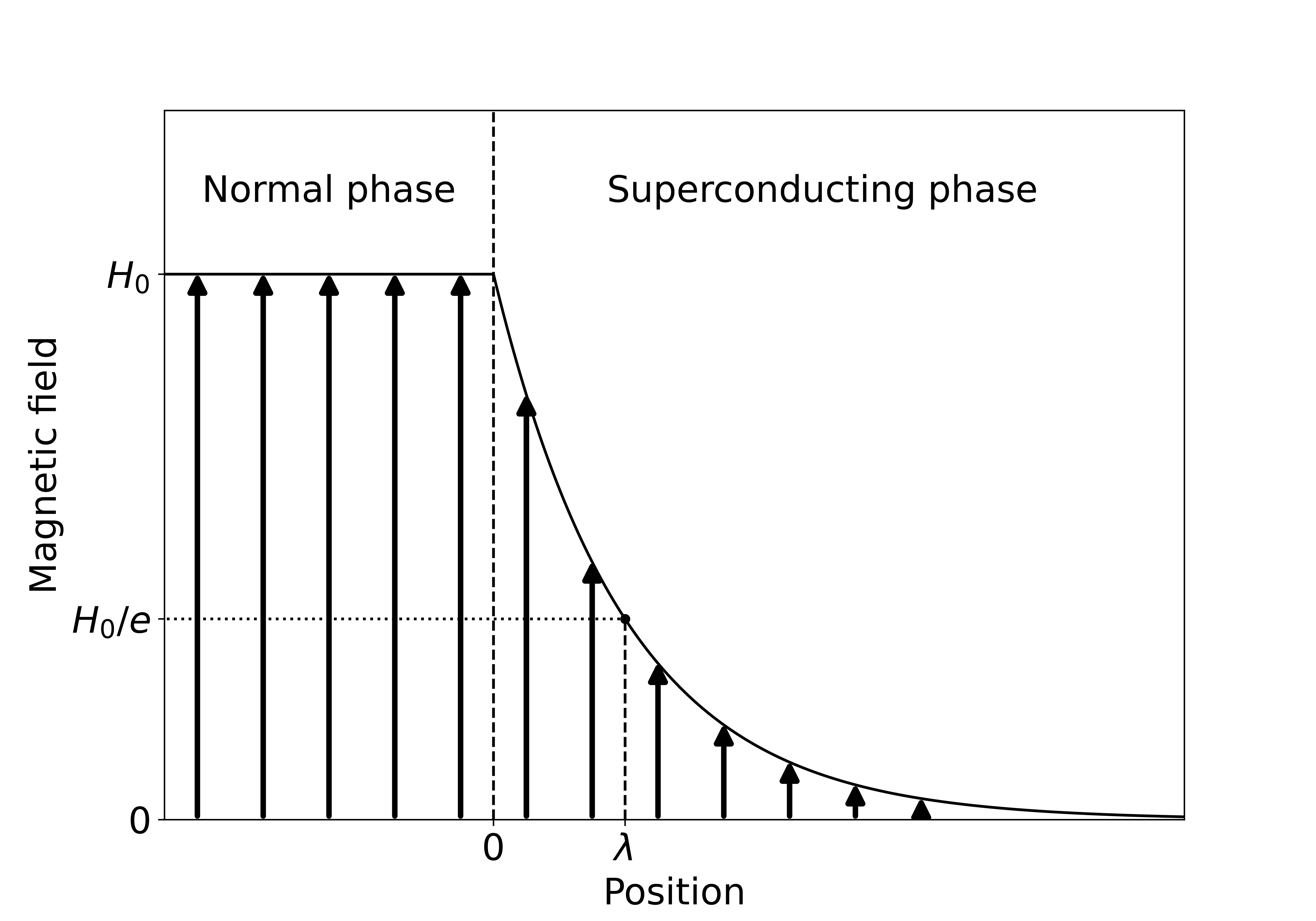
An external magnetic field applied outside of a superconductor penetrates into it over the London penetration depth. This magnetic field repels the vortex close to the boundary, making up the second half of the Bean–Livingston barrier.

In superconductivity, the Bean–Livingston barrier is the energy barrier that prevents Abrikosov vortices from entering or exiting a type-II superconductor through its surface, despite the magnetic field being higher than the first critical field, which makes the existence of vortices energetically favourable. This barrier leads to hysteresis in the magnetization curve of a superconducting sample. The barrier is named after C.P. Bean and J.D. Livingston.

== Origin ==
The Bean–Livingston barrier arises from the competition between two forces that act on a vortex close to the surface of a type-II superconductor. The first one is the external magnetic field which penetrates into the superconductor over the London penetration depth, and repulses the vortex from the surface. Secondly, the vortex creates an effective image vortex on the opposite side of the surface. Because this vortex is of opposite sign, the real vortex is attracted to it. The competition between these two forces creates an energy barrier that blocks vortices from entering or exiting the superconductor at low magnetic fields, and disappears at higher magnetic fields.

== Mathematical description ==
To mathematically describe the Bean–Livingston barrier, one considers a vortex close to the edge (placed at $x=0$) of a semi-infinite superconducting slab. Without the vortex and with an external magnetic field $H_0$, the magnetic field inside the superconductor is given by

$$H=H_0e^{-x/\lambda},$$

where $\lambda$ is the London penetration depth.

If a vortex is placed close to the edge, the magnetic field is distorted due to the boundary conditions at the edge of the sample, since there can be no current perpendicular to the surface. Using the method of images, this can be achieved by adding an antivortex at the same distance on the other side of the interface. Thus, the total magnetic field is

$$H=H_0e^{-x/\lambda}+\frac{\Phi_0}{2\pi \lambda^2}\left[ K_0\left( \frac{|\mathbf{x}-\mathbf{x}_1|}{\lambda}\right) - K_0\left( \frac{|\mathbf{x}-\mathbf{x}_2|}{\lambda} \right) \right],$$

where $\Phi_0$ is the magnetic flux quantum, $K_0(x)$ is the modified Bessel function, (Note: The magnetic field around an Abrikosov vortex is described by the modified Bessel function.) $\mathbf{x}_1=(x_1,0)$ is the position of the real vortex and $\mathbf{x}_2=(-x_1,0)$ is the position of the image vortex.

From this, the energy associated with the vortex is obtained from calculating the energy difference caused by the magnetic field:

$$U=-\frac{1}{4\pi}\mathbf{H}_0\int \mathbf{H} \, dV.$$

This results in

$$U(x_1)=\frac{\Phi_0}{4\pi}\left[ H_0 e^{-x_1/\lambda} - \frac{\Phi_0}{4\pi \lambda^2} K_0(2x_1/\lambda) - H_0 + H_{c1} \right],$$

where $H_{c1}$ is the lower critical field.

This derivation is for a semi-infinite slab, as in the original work by Bean and Livingston. A similar derivation can be performed in hollow cylinders as well.

== See also ==
- Bean's critical state model
