= The Crown of Winter =

Studio album by Forest Stream
- Released: August 11, 2009
- Recorded: Autumn 2008 at the S&O Homestudio, Chernogolovka
- Genre: Symphonic black metal Black/doom; Death/doom; Doom metal Symphonic metal Gothic metal
- Length: 59:55
- Label: Candlelight Records

Forest Stream chronology
Tears of Mortal Solitude (2003)	The Crown of Winter (2009)

Professional ratings
Review scores
Source	Rating
Allmusic	3/5 stars

The Crown of Winter is the second full-length album by the Russian symphonic black / doom / Gothic metal band Forest Stream. Originally scheduled for release on March 23, 2009 through Candlelight Records, it was delayed until August 11.

== Track listing ==
1. "Intro (Feral Magic)" - 2:19
2. "The Crown of Winter" - 11:44
3. "Mired" - 9:27
4. "Bless You to Die" - 7:39
5. "Autumn Dancers" - 8:40
6. "The Seventh Symphony of..." - 9:05
7. "The Beautiful Nature" - 9:25
8. "Outro (the Awakening Dreamland)" - 1:41
