= Institute of Solid State Physics (Russia) =

Research institute in Russia

- Established: February 15, 1963
- Address: Chernogolovka, Moscow District, 2 Academician Ossipyan Street, 142432
- Location: Chernogolovka, Russia
- Website: www.issp.ac.ru/engl/

The Institute of Solid State Physics (ISSP; Russian: Институт физики твердого тела) of the Russian Academy of Sciences is a research institution, located in the small town of Chernogolovka near Moscow in Russia. Founded on February 15, 1963, the institute has grown to become one of the largest physics institutes in the country. Its main fields of research are condensed matter physics and materials science.

== About the institute ==
The Institute of Solid State Physics was established on February 15, 1963 by the Academy of Sciences of the USSR (now the Russian Academy of Sciences). The main organizers of the institute were Georgii Kurdyumov, Yuri Osipyan, and Cheslav Kopetsky. Osipyan was the director of the institute from 1963 to 2001. During his tenure as the director, he contacted students from universities such as Lomonosov Moscow State University and brought them to the institute for practical training and education. He was principal research adviser of the institute from 2002 to 2008.

The institute has 22 laboratories, and more than 200 physical scientists and engineers. It carries out research in theoretical and experimental condensed matter physics and physical metallurgy. The fundamental insights gained in these fields are also applied to develop new technologies. The institute is one of the leaders in areas such as superconductivity, physics of fullerenes, physics of defects, crystal growth, amorphous and nanocrystalline materials, and other areas of condensed matter physics.

The institute is also an educational center; it provides education and training to undergraduate as well as doctorate students in physical sciences. Students from Moscow Institute of Physics and Technology, Moscow Institute of Steel and Alloys, and Faculty of Physics and Division of Physical Chemistry of Lomonosov Moscow State University are allowed to study and train at the institute. The Department of General and Applied Physics of MIPT collaborates with the institute.

The institute also organizes conferences and seminars on various areas of condensed matter physics.

Andre Geim obtained his PhD from the institute in 1987, he would go on to win the Nobel Prize in Physics in 2010 "for groundbreaking experiments regarding the two-dimensional material graphene".

== Laboratories ==
The institute has 22 laboratories:

- Laboratory of Spectroscopy of Defect Structures was one of the first laboratories established within ISSP. It carries out research in fields such as superconductivity, the electronic properties of extended defects in semiconductors, etc.
- Laboratory of Nonequilbrium Electron Processes was established in 1976 and carries out research in fields such as Bose–Einstein condensate.
- Laboratory of Electronic Kinetics was established in 1974 by Vsevolod Gantmakher. It carries out research in the fields such as electron scattering and superconductivity that occurs in disordered materials.
- Laboratory of Quantum Transport was established in 1988 and carries out research in transport properties of low-dimensional semiconductors at ultra-low temperatures and in quantizing magnetic fields.
- Laboratory of Quantum Crystals carries out research in fields of quantum fluid, quantum solid and transport properties in condensed matter systems.
- Laboratory of Superconductivity carries out research in various fields of superconductivity.
- Theoretical Department carries out research in fields such as spintronics, nanostructures and quantum cryptography.
- Laboratory of Structural Research carries out research in fields such as structure and phase transitions in amorphous metals, nanocrystalline materials, scintillators, fullerenes, and other materials.
- Laboratory of Real Structure of Crystals carries out research concerning the arise of stable defects and how they move in crystals in highly excited states.
- Laboratory of Spectroscopy of Semiconductor Surfaces was founded in 1980 by Vitas A. Grazhulis. It carries out research in atomic and electronic structure of metal compounds (such as manganites), transport properties of semiconductors, and so forth.
- Laboratory of High Pressure Physics carries out investigations in phase transition in solids; it also carries out studies in crystalline, nanocrystalline, amorphous metals and carbon nanostructures.
- Laboratory of Optical Strength and Diagnostics of Crystals was organized in 1987. During the initial period, it investigated the interactions of intense laser radiation with solids and technological development of optical devices, which had the ability to withstand radiation fluxes with an average power of tens of kilowatts (kW). The laboratory carries out research concerning, among others, the optical diagnostics of crystals.
- Laboratory of Materials Science carries out research in various aspects of material sciences and metallurgy.
- Laboratory of Reinforced Systems carries out investigations in fiber composites with ceramic matrix composites (CMC) and metal matrix composites (MMC), and formation of nano-structure in amorphous alloys of iron and cobalt.
- Laboratory of Internal Boundaries in Metals was founded in 1983. It carries out research in kinetics and thermodynamics of individual grain and interphase boundaries, grain boundary phase transitions, grain growth, grain boundary diffusion, and migration of grain boundary diffusion.
- Laboratory of Crystallization from High-Temperature Solutions carries out investigations in fields such as phase equilibrium in oxide systems and single crystal growth.
- Profiled Crystals Laboratory was founded in 2007. It investigates growing volume and profiled crystals melt, and develops technologies for growing shaped sapphire crystals, and new materials and coatings based on silicon carbide (SiC).
- Laboratory of Controlled Crystal Growth carries out investigates various aspects of crystal growth.
- Laboratory of Physical-Chemical Basis of Crystallization carries out investigation in the melt growth of single crystals of inorganic compounds and the chemical physics behind the compounds.
- Laboratory of Materials for Electrochemical Technologies was established in July 2013. It carries out research in the development of new materials for solid oxide fuel cells (SOFC), ceramic membranes and similar devices.
- Nanolithography Sector investigation include among others the formation of new techniques of optical and electron nanolithography.
- Department of Special Materials Processing carries out research in the production of graphite, crystal, quartz and glass articles.
