= Physical metallurgy =

Physics studies of metallurgy

Physical metallurgy is one of the two main branches of the scientific approach to metallurgy, which considers in a systematic way the physical properties of metals and alloys. It is basically the fundamentals and applications of the theory of phase transformations in metal and alloys. While chemical metallurgy involves the domain of reduction/oxidation of metals, physical metallurgy deals mainly with mechanical and magnetic/electric/thermal properties of metals – as described by solid-state physics.

== Early history ==
An iron-carbon phase diagram showing the conditions necessary to form different phases

Timeline:

- 1831 – Pavel Petrovich Anosov looks at metals in a microscope.
- 1841 – Anosov finds the secret to Damascus steel.
- 1868 – Dmitry Chernov founds physical metallurgy. He identifies the critical points of steel.
- 1875 – William Chandler Roberts-Austen provides the diagram Ag-Cu.
- 1878 – Adolf Martens describes relations between microstructure and physical properties, specially the role of kinks, defects and crystallization.
- 1887 – Henry Clifton Sorby determines the pearlite structure.
- 1887 – Floris Osmond gives the name and symbols associated to the phases of steel.
- 1896 – First attempt at the Fe-C diagram of steel by Albert Sauveur.
- 1897 – Roberts-Austen provides the complete Fe-C diagram. He also described the high temperature phase of steel (austenite).
- 1900 – Hendrik Willem Bakhuis Roozeboom publishes the Fe Fe_{3}C diagram taking into accounts Gibbs phase rule.
- 1906 – Alfred Wilm discovers age hardening by accident.
- 1919 –Gustav Heinrich Tammann predicts the order-disorder transition of alloys at low temperature
- 1922 – Arne Westgren and Robert P. Fragman showed that the γ phase of steel is face-centered cubic (fcc), while the α, β and δ phases are body centered cubic.
- 1923 – Edgar Bain discovers superlattices
- 1926 – Bain describes the atomistic formation of martensite.
- 1926 – William Hume-Rothery enumerates the Hume-Rothery rules.
- 1930 – Georgy Kurdyumov and George Sachs reveal the orientation of martensite and austenite, now named the Kurdyumov–Sachs orientation.
- 1947 – Ernest Kirkendall experiment reveals the vacancy mechanism of diffusion. Its discovery was called the Kirkendall effect.
- 1953 – E. O. Hall and independently N. J. Petch publish their theory of grain boundary strengthening (Hall–Petch law).

== See also ==
- Extractive metallurgy
