= Volodymyr Nemoshkalenko =

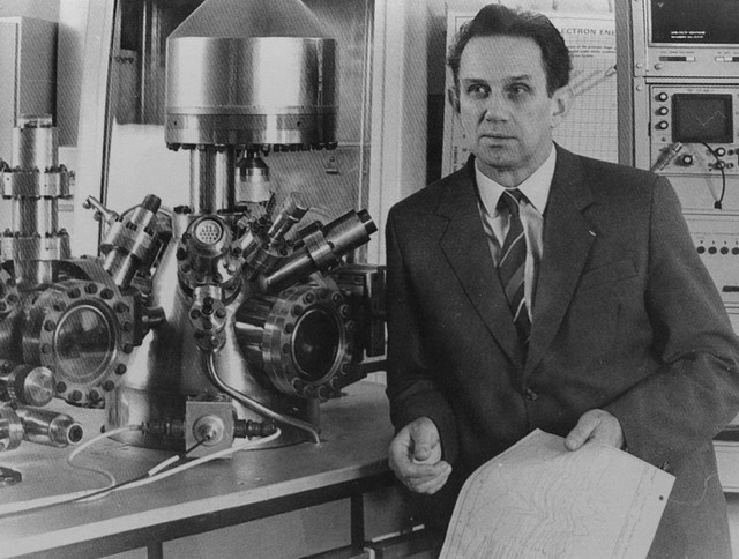
- Born: Volodymyr Volodymyrovych Nemoshkalenko; March 26, 1933; Stalingrad, RSFSR, Soviet Union
- Died: June 25, 2002 (aged 69); Kyiv, Ukraine
- Citizenship: Ukraine
- Education: Kyiv Polytechnic Institute
- Known for: inoxidability of simple forms of matter, solid state spectroscopy
- Awards: Order of the Badge of Honour, Order of the Red Banner of Labour, Order of Prince Yaroslav the Wise, State Prize of Ukrainian SSR, State Prize of USSR, State Prize of RSFSR, State Prize of Ukraine.
- Scientific career
- Fields: Solid State Physics
- Workplaces: G. V. Kurdyumov Institute for Metal Physics of the National Academy of Sciences of Ukraine

Volodymyr Volodymyrovych Nemoshkalenko (Ukrainian: Володимир Володимирович Немошкаленко; 26 March 1933 – 25 June 2002) was a Soviet and Ukrainian physicist, full member (academician) of the National Academy of Sciences of Ukraine (1982). He was best known for the development and application of methods of computational physics in the solid state spectroscopy and, in particular, for the discovery of the phenomenon of inoxidability of simple forms of matter on the surface of the celestial bodies.

== Biography ==
In 1956, he graduated from the Kyiv Polytechnic Institute. From 1956 he worked at the Institute of Metal Physics of NAS of Ukraine (since 1963 – head of department, since 1967 – Deputy Director of the institute, since 1989 – Director).

His main achievements are associated with the development of physical basis of spectroscopic methods, which allowed to obtain reliable information about the electronic structure and electronic properties of materials, and in merging the electron spectroscopy experiment with the electronic band structure calculations—the two research directions which he had founded in the Institute of Metal Physics. V.V. Nemoshkalenko is co-discoverer of the phenomenon of inoxidability of simple forms of matter on the surface of the celestial bodies.

He died in Kyiv at the age of 69.

== Honors and awards ==
- Order of the Badge of Honour, 1971
- Corresponding member of the National Academy of Sciences of Ukraine, since 1973
- Prize of K.D. Sinelnikov, 1977
- State Prize of Ukrainian SSR, 1980
- Order of the Red Banner of Labour, 1981
- Member of the National Academy of Science of Ukraine, since 1982.
- USSR State Prize, 1985
- State Prize of RSFSR, 1989
- State Prize of Ukraine, 1992, 2002
- Prize of N.P. Barabashov, 1992
- Order of Prince Yaroslav the Wise, 1997
- Prize of G.V. Kurdyumov, 1999
