= Nikolai Kopilov =

Russian chess player

Personal information
- Full name: Nikolai Georgiyevich Kopilov
- Born: 26 October 1919 Novonikolayevsk, now Novosibirsk, Soviet Union
- Died: 7 May 1995 (aged 75) Voronezh, Russia

Chess career
- Country: Russia
- Title: International Correspondence Chess Master (1969)
- ICCF rating: 2390 (July 1994)
- ICCF peak rating: 2450 (July 1991)

Nikolai Georgiyevich Kopilov (Russian: Николай Георгиевич Копылов, also transliterated Nikolai Georgievich Kopylov; 26 October 1919 – 7 May 1995) was a Russian chess player from Novonikolayevsk. He worked as a lecturer in a higher technical training institute. He had three sons, including physicist Vladimir Kopylov. He was married to chess master Evgenia Biglova.

== Chess career ==
He became a chess master of the USSR in 1946. He defeated Botvinnik, Keres, Petrosian and Boleslavsky in the 19th USSR Championship in 1951, where he finished in 11th place out of 17. He won the Leningrad City Chess Championship in 1954 (a tournament won the following year by Viktor Korchnoi).

He played correspondence chess from 1964, and played for the Soviet team in the 6th and 7th Postal Olympiads with scores of 6 out of 8 and 5.5 out of 9. He became an International Master of correspondence chess in 1969, gaining the title from the International Correspondence Chess Federation on the basis of his 5.5 out of 8 score on 3rd board in the European Team Chess Championship.

He died on 7 May 1995 while giving a simultaneous exhibition in Voronezh.
