= Kurdyumov Institute of Metal Physics =

Soviet-Ukrainian research institute

Coordinates: 50.4663°N 30.3625°E

G. V. Kurdyumov Institute for Metal Physics (IMP) of the National Academy of Sciences of Ukraine (NASU)
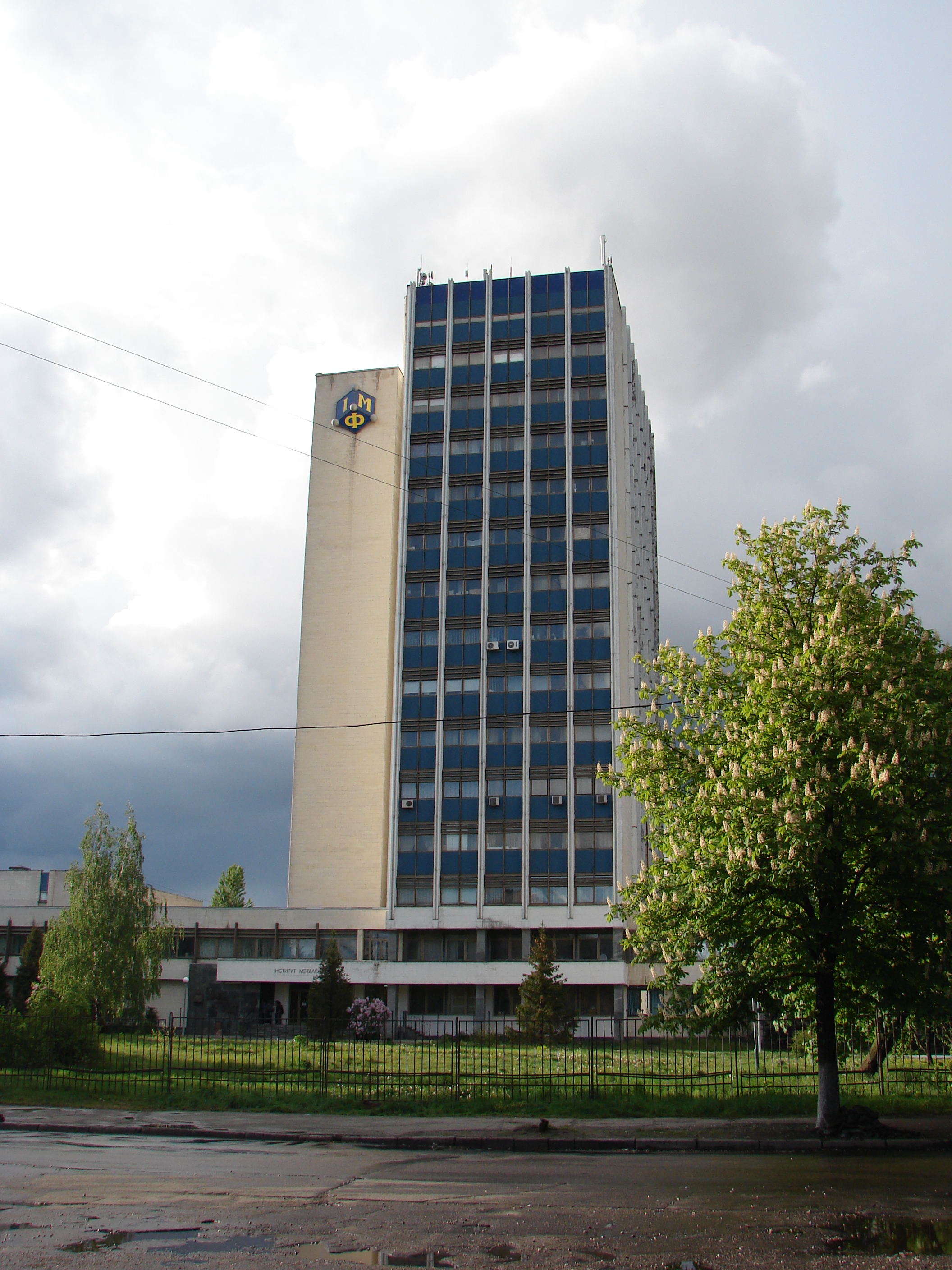
- Main building of the institute
- Established: 1945
- Director: Valentyn A. Tatarenko
- Staff: 600
- Address: 36 Acad. Vernadsky Boulevard, UA-03142 Kyiv, Ukraine
- Location: Kyiv, Ukraine
- Website: http://www.imp.kiev.ua/

The G. V. Kurdyumov Institute for Metal Physics (IMP) of the National Academy of Sciences of Ukraine (Ukrainian: Інститут металофізики ім. Г. В. Курдюмова Національної академії наук України, romanized: Instytut metalofizyky im. H. V. Kurdiumova Natsionalnoi akademii nauk Ukrainy) – scientific institution, the largest in Ukraine and Europe center of basic research in the field of metal physics, is one of the oldest research institutions of physical science within the Academy. It is named after Georgy Kurdyumov, a Soviet metallurgist and physicist.

Currently, the Institute employs more than 250 researchers (together with several Full Members and Corresponding Members of the NASU) and around 150 peoples of supporting personnel. It has more than 20 scientific units (including the state-of-the-art hardware) which are grouped around several research programs.

Traditionally, the Institute is focused on fundamental research. At the same time, applied research on metals, their alloys, and related nanotechnologies strengthen the Institute's activities.

The IMP is consistently ranked at the top of national academic institutions ranking. Besides, international reputation of IOP is growing constantly as prominent scientists from the Institute expand their activity to leading foreign research centers and universities.

== History ==
History of the Kurdyumov Institute of Metal Physics of Ukraine began in 1945, when on the basis of the Department of Metal Physics of the Institute of Ferrous Metallurgy of the USSR Academy of Sciences was established Laboratory of Metal Physics of the USSR Academy of Sciences, reorganized in 1955 into the Institute of Metal Physics.

== Publishings ==
The institute publishes scientific journals "Metal Physics and the latest technologies", "Successes of metal physics" and a collection of scientific papers "Nanosystems, nanomaterials, nanotechnologies".

== Directors ==
- 1945 – 1951 Georgii Kurdyumov
- 1951 – 1954 Vitaliy Danylov
- 1955 Adrian Smirnov
- 1955 – 1985 Vitaliy Gridnev
- 1985 – 1989 Viktor Bariakhtar
- 1989 – 2002 Volodymyr Nemoshkalenko
- 2002 – 2011 Anatoliy Shpak
- 2011 – 2019 Orest Ivasyshyn
- 2019 — Valentyn Tatarenko
