= Pinning force =

Pinning force is a force acting on a pinned object from a pinning center. In solid state physics, this most often refers to the vortex pinning, the pinning of the magnetic vortices (magnetic flux quanta, Abrikosov vortices) by different kinds of the defects in a type II superconductor. Important quantities are the individual maximal pinning force, which defines the depinning of a single vortex, and an average pinning force, which defines the depinning of the correlated vortex structures and can be associated with the critical current density (the maximal density of non-dissipative current). The interaction of the correlated vortex lattice with system of pinning centers forms the magnetic phase diagram of the vortex matter in superconductors. This phase diagram is especially rich for high temperature superconductors (HTSC) where the thermo-activation processes are essential.

The pinning mechanism is based on the fact that the amount of grain boundary area is reduced when a particle is located on a grain boundary. It is also assumed that particles are spherical and the particle-matrix interface is incoherent. When a moving grain boundary meets a particle at an angle $\beta$, the particle exerts a pinning force $F$ on the grain boundary that is equal to $F = 2\pi \sigma \cos \beta \sin \beta$; with $r$ the particle radius and $\sigma$ the energy per unit of grain boundary area.

== See also ==
- Flux pinning
