= Uniqueness theorem for Poisson's equation =

For a large class of boundary conditions, all solutions have the same gradient

The uniqueness theorem for Poisson's equation states that, for a large class of boundary conditions, the equation may have many solutions, but the gradient of every solution is the same. In the case of electrostatics, this means that there is a unique electric field derived from a potential function satisfying Poisson's equation under the boundary conditions.

== Proof ==
The general expression for Poisson's equation in electrostatics is

$$\mathbf{\nabla}^2 \varphi = -\frac{\rho_f}{\epsilon_0},$$

where $\varphi$ is the electric potential and $\rho_f$ is the charge distribution over some region $V$ with boundary surface $S$ .

The uniqueness of the solution can be proven for a large class of boundary conditions as follows.

Suppose that we claim to have two solutions of Poisson's equation. Let us call these two solutions $\varphi_1$ and $\varphi_2$. Then

$\mathbf{\nabla}^2 \varphi_1 = - \frac{\rho_f}{\epsilon_0},$ and

$$\mathbf{\nabla}^2 \varphi_2 = - \frac{\rho_f}{\epsilon_0}.$$

It follows that $\varphi=\varphi_2-\varphi_1$ is a solution of Laplace's equation, which is a special case of Poisson's equation that equals to $0$. Subtracting the two solutions above gives

$$\mathbf{\nabla}^2 \varphi = \mathbf{\nabla}^2 \varphi_2 - \mathbf{\nabla}^2 \varphi_1 = 0.$$	1

By applying the vector differential identity we know that

$$\nabla \cdot (\varphi \, \nabla \varphi )= \, (\nabla \varphi )^2 + \varphi \, \nabla^2 \varphi.$$

However, from (1) we also know that throughout the region $\nabla^2 \varphi = 0.$ Consequently, the second term goes to zero and we find that

$$\nabla \cdot (\varphi \, \nabla \varphi )= \, (\nabla \varphi )^2.$$

By taking the volume integral over the region $V$, we find that

$$\int_V \mathbf{\nabla}\cdot(\varphi \, \mathbf{\nabla}\varphi) \, \mathrm{d}V = \int_V (\mathbf{\nabla}\varphi)^2 \, \mathrm{d}V.$$

By applying the divergence theorem, we rewrite the expression above as

$$\int_{S} (\varphi \, \mathbf{\nabla}\varphi) \cdot \mathrm{d}\mathbf{S}= \int_V (\mathbf{\nabla}\varphi)^2 \, \mathrm{d}V.$$	2

We now sequentially consider three distinct boundary conditions: a Dirichlet boundary condition, a Neumann boundary condition, and a mixed boundary condition.

First, we consider the case where Dirichlet boundary conditions are specified as $\varphi = 0$ on the boundary of the region. If the Dirichlet boundary condition is satisfied on $S$ by both solutions (i.e., if $\varphi = 0$ on the boundary), then the left-hand side of (2) is zero. Consequently, we find that

$$\int_V (\mathbf{\nabla}\varphi)^2 \, \mathrm{d}V = 0.$$

Since this is the volume integral of a positive quantity (due to the squared term), we must have $\nabla \varphi = 0$ at all points. Further, because the gradient of $\varphi$ is everywhere zero and $\varphi$ is zero on the boundary, $\varphi$ must be zero throughout the whole region. Finally, since $\varphi = 0$ throughout the whole region, and since $\varphi = \varphi_2 - \varphi_1$ throughout the whole region, therefore $\varphi_1 = \varphi_2$ throughout the whole region. This completes the proof that there is the unique solution of Poisson's equation with a Dirichlet boundary condition.

Second, we consider the case where Neumann boundary conditions are specified as $\nabla\varphi = 0$ on the boundary of the region. If the Neumann boundary condition is satisfied on $S$ by both solutions, then the left-hand side of (2) is zero again. Consequently, as before, we find that

$$\int_V (\mathbf{\nabla}\varphi)^2 \, \mathrm{d}V = 0.$$

As before, since this is the volume integral of a positive quantity, we must have $\nabla \varphi = 0$ at all points. Further, because the gradient of $\varphi$ is everywhere zero within the volume $V$, and because the gradient of $\varphi$ is everywhere zero on the boundary $S$, therefore $\varphi$ must be constant---but not necessarily zero---throughout the whole region. Finally, since $\varphi = k$ throughout the whole region, and since $\varphi = \varphi_2 - \varphi_1$ throughout the whole region, therefore $\varphi_1 = \varphi_2 - k$ throughout the whole region. This completes the proof that there is the unique solution up to an additive constant of Poisson's equation with a Neumann boundary condition.

Mixed boundary conditions could be given as long as either the gradient or the potential is specified at each point of the boundary. Boundary conditions at infinity also hold. This results from the fact that the surface integral in (2) still vanishes at large distances because the integrand decays faster than the surface area grows.

== See also ==
- Poisson's equation
- Gauss's law
- Coulomb's law
- Method of images
- Green's function
- Uniqueness theorem
- Spherical harmonics
