= George Sachs =

German chemist (1896–1960)

George Sachs (April 5, 1896 – October 30, 1960) was a Russian-born German and American metallurgist.

Born in Moscow, he taught at Frankfurt University (1930-1935), and the Case Institute of Technology (now Case Western Reserve University, CWRU; him since 1942)

He was of Jewish birth, and left Germany with his family in 1937 to escape Nazi persecution, and settled in the United States. He was the father of the astronomer Rainer K. Sachs.

He is known for his work on Kurdyumov–Sachs orientations with Georgy Kurdyumov.

== Works ==
- Praktische Metallkunde, 1933
- George Sachs (1937). Spanlose Formung der Metalle. Eigenspannungen in Metallen. Akademische Verlagsgesellschaft.
- International Nickel Company, Vsevolod Nicholas Krivobok, George Sachs (1947). Forming of Austenitic Chromium-nickel Stainless Steels. International Nickel Company.
- Oscar Hoffman; George Sachs (1953). Introduction to the Theory of Plasticity for Engineers. McGraw-Hill.
- George Sachs (1954). Fundamentals of the Working of Metals. Interscience Publishers.
- George Sachs; Henry Edward Voegeli (1966). Principles and Methods of Sheetmetal Fabricating. Malabar, Fla: Krieger Publishing Company. ISBN 0-442-15171-3.
- George Sachs; Kent R. Van Horn (1940). Practical metallurgy: applied physical metallurgy and the industrial processing of ferrous and nonferrous metals and alloys. Cleveland, Ohio: The American Society for Metals. p. 567.
