= Levitation based inertial sensing =

Levitation based inertial sensing is a new and rapidly growing technique for measuring linear acceleration, rotation and orientation of a body. Based on this technique, inertial sensors such as accelerometers and gyroscopes, enables ultra-sensitive inertial sensing. For example, the world's best accelerometer used in the LISA Pathfinder in-flight experiment is based on a levitation system which reaches a sensitivity of $<10^{-15}\,{\rm g}/\sqrt{\rm Hz}$ and noise of $<10^{-14}\,\rm m/s^2/\sqrt{Hz}$.

== History ==
The pioneering work related to the microparticle levitation was performed by Artur Ashkin in 1970. He demonstrated optical trapping of dielectric microspheres for the first time, forming an optical levitation system, by using a focused laser beam in air and liquid. This new technology was later named "optical tweezer" and applied in biochemistry and biophysics. Later, significant scientific progress on optically levitated systems was made, for example the cooling of the center of mass motion of a micro- or nanoparticle in the millikelvin regime. Very recently a research group published a paper showing motional quantum ground state cooling of a levitated nanoparticle. In addition, levitation based on electrostatic and magnetic approaches have also been proposed and realized.

Levitation systems have shown high force sensitivities in the $\rm zN/\sqrt{Hz}$ range. For example, an optically levitated dielectric particle has been shown to exhibit force sensitivities beyond ~ $2\times10^{-20}\,\rm N/\sqrt{Hz}$. Thus, levitation systems show promise for ultra-sensitive force sensing, such as detection of short-range interactions. By levitating micro- or mesoparticles with a relatively large mass, this system can be employed as a high-performance inertial sensor, demonstrating nano-g sensitivity.

== Method ==
One possible working principle behind a levitation based inertial sensing system is the following. By levitating a micro-object in vacuum and after a cool-down process, the center of mass motion of the micro-object can be controlled and coupled to the kinematic states of the system. Once the system's kinematic state changes (in other words, the system undergoes linear or rotational acceleration), the center of mass motion of the levitated micro-object is affected and yields a signal. This signal is related to the changes of the system's kinematic states and can be read out.

Regarding levitation techniques, there are generally three different approaches: optical, electrostatic and magnetic.

== Applications ==
The sub-attonewton force sensitivity of levitation based system could show promise for applications in many different fields, such as Casimir force sensing, gravitational wave detection and inertial sensing. For inertial sensing, levitation based system could be used to make high-performance accelerometers and gyroscopes employed in inertial measurement units (IMUs) and inertial navigation systems (INSs). These are used in such applications as drone navigation in tunnels and mines, guidance of unmanned aerial vehicles (UAVs), or stabilization of micro-satellites. Levitation based Inertial sensors that have sufficient sensitivity and low noise ($<10^{-9}\,\rm m/s^2/\sqrt{Hz}$) for measurements in the seismic band ($\rm 0.1\,mHz$ to $\rm 10\,Hz$) can be used in the field of seismometry, in which current inertial sensors cannot meet the requirements.

There are already some commercial products on the market. One example is the iOSG Superconducting gravity sensor, which is based on magnetic levitation and shows a noise of $<1\,\rm(nm/s^2)^2Hz$.

== Advantages ==
The future trends in inertial sensing require that inertial sensors have lower cost, higher performance, and smaller in size. Levitation based inertial sensing systems have already shown high performance. For example, the accelerometer used in the LISA Pathfinder in-flight experiment has a sensitivity of $<10^{-15}\,\rm g/\sqrt{Hz}$ and noise of $<10^{-14}\,\rm m/s^2/\sqrt{Hz}$.
