= Flux pinning =

Phenomenon related to superconductivity

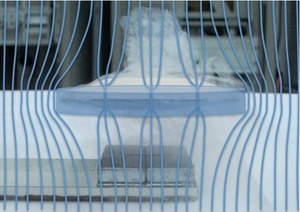
Flux Pinning: Flux Tube diagram

Flux pinning is a phenomenon that occurs when flux vortices in a type-II superconductor are prevented from moving within the bulk of the superconductor, so that the magnetic field lines are "pinned" to those locations. The superconductor must be a type-II superconductor because type-I superconductors cannot be penetrated by magnetic fields. Some type-I superconductors can experience the effects of flux pinning if they are thin enough. If the material's thickness is comparable to the London penetration depth, the magnetic field can pass through the material. The act of magnetic penetration is what makes flux pinning possible. At higher magnetic fields (above lower critical field H_{c,1}but below upper critical field H_{c,2}) the superconductor allows magnetic flux to enter in quantized packets surrounded by a superconducting current vortex (see Quantum vortex). These sites of penetration are known as flux tubes. The number of flux tubes per unit area is proportional to the magnetic field with a constant of proportionality equal to the magnetic flux quantum. On a simple 76 millimeter diameter, 1-micrometer thick disk, next to a magnetic field of 28 kA/m, there are approximately 100 billion flux tubes that hold 70,000 times the superconductor's weight. At lower temperatures the flux tubes are pinned in place and cannot move. This pinning is what holds the superconductor in place thereby allowing it to levitate. This phenomenon is closely related to the Meissner effect, though with one crucial difference — the Meissner effect shields the superconductor from all magnetic fields causing repulsion, unlike the pinned state of the superconductor disk which pins flux, and the superconductor in place.

== Importance ==
Flux pinning is desirable in high-temperature ceramic superconductors to prevent "flux creep", which can create a pseudo-resistance and depress both critical current density and critical field.

Degradation of a high-temperature superconductor's properties due to flux creep is a limiting factor in the use of these superconductors. High-temperature SQUID magnetometers suffer reduced precision in a certain range of applied field due to flux creep, and the maximum field strength of high-temperature superconducting magnets is drastically reduced by the depression in critical field.

=== Potential applications ===
The worth of flux pinning is seen through many implementations such as lifts, frictionless joints, and transportation. The thinner the superconducting layer, the stronger the pinning that occurs when exposed to magnetic fields. Since the superconductor is pinned above the magnet away from any surfaces, there is the potential for a frictionless joint. Transportation is another area in which flux pinning technology could revolutionize and reform. MagSurf was developed by the Paris Diderot University utilizing flux pinning to create a hoverboard-like effect that could transport a person, demonstrating the usefulness of the technology. The Federal University of Rio de Janeiro has also been developing a flux pinning-based MagLev system called Maglev Cobra, which aims for a smaller form factor than existing urban rail systems. There has also been some research into using the flux pinning effect to isolate vibrations for microdevices. The ability to fix the superconductor in space can be used as a damping device like a spring. This idea has proposed for isolating vibrations for parts in satellites.

== See also ==
- Domain wall (magnetism)
- Husimi Q representation
- Magnetic domain
- Magnetic flux quantum
- Quantum vortex
- Topological defect
- Pinning force

== Other sources ==
- Future Science introduction to high-temperature superconductors.
- American Magnetics tutorial on magnetic field exclusion and flux pinning in superconductors.
- Cern Lhc documentation Stability of superconductors.
- Flux-Pinning of Bi_{2}Sr_{2}CaCu_{2}O_{(8 + Delta)} High T_{c} Superconducting Tapes Utilizing (Sr,Ca)_{14}Cu_{24}O_{(41 + Delta)} and Sr_{2}CaAl_{2}O_{6} Defects (T. Haugan; et al. AFB OH Propulsion Directorate. Air Force Research Lab Wright-Patterson. October 2003)
- Superconducting Magnetic Levitation (MagLev) on a Magnetic Track Ithaca College Physics demonstration of the Meissner effect and flux pinning.
