= Georgy Kurdyumov =

Soviet physicist and metallurgist (1902-1996)

- Born: Georgy Vyacheslavovich Kurdyumov; February 14, 1902; Rylsk, Kursk Governorate, Russian Empire
- Died: July 6, 1996 (aged 94); Moscow, Russia
- Citizenship: Soviet
- Education: Ioffe Physical-Technical Institute of the Russian Academy of Sciences
- Known for: Kurdyumov-Sachs (K-S) orientation
- Awards: Hero of Socialist Labour
- Scientific career
- Fields: Metallurgy

Georgy Vyacheslavovich Kurdyumov (Russian: Георгий Вячеславович Курдюмов; 14 February 1902 – 6 July 1996) was a Soviet metallurgist and physicist. He went on to become one of the most famous metallurgist of his time in the Soviet Union. When the Institute of Solid State Physics was established on February 15, 1963, he was one of the main organizers of the institute.

== Early days ==
Georgy Kurdyumov was born on February 14, 1902, in Rylsk. His father was a priest. He trained as a physicist at the Ioffe Institute in Saint Petersburg. As a young scientist, he took interest in metallurgy and after obtaining his diploma, he was one of the 220 Soviet Union scientists who were allowed to spend time abroad. He went to Germany, and worked with George Sachs in Berlin. Their collaboration resulted in Kurdyumov-Sachs (K-S) orientation.

== Career ==
After he moved back to the Soviet Union, he went to Ukraine and became one of the founders of the Dnepropetrovsk Physico-Technical Institute in Dnipropetrovsk. He was appointed director of the institute. After the Second World War, he and the institute moved to Moscow. He was Director of the Institute for Physical Metallurgy of the Central Research Institute of Ferrous Metallurgy in Moscow from 1944 to 1978. He also helped to establish the Laboratory for Metal Physics in Ukraine. The Laboratory for Metal Physics was founded on November 15, 1945, by the All-Ukrainian Academy of Sciences (now the National Academy of Sciences of Ukraine). From 1945 to 1951, he was the head of the laboratory. Today it has been renamed as G. V. Kurdyumov Institute for Metal Physics.

The Institute of Solid State Physics was established by the Academy of Sciences of the Soviet Union on February 15, 1963; he, together with Yuri Osipyan and Cheslav Kopetsky, were the main organizers of institute. He also supervised the PhD thesis of Osipyan. He was a full member of the Academy of Sciences of the Soviet Union.

He made major contributions to the development of physical metallurgy. He performed pioneering work in the study of martensitic transformation in crystalline materials that are of fundamental importance for the theory of phase transitions and heat treatment of steels and alloys.

He was awarded the title of Hero of Socialist Labour (March 13, 1969), five Orders of Lenin (1954, 1962, 1969, 1975 and 1982), the Order of the October Revolution (1972), two Orders of the Red Banner of Labour (1945 and 1958), and a Stalin Prize (1949).

He died on July 6, 1996, in Moscow.
