= Chernogolovka =

Town in Moscow Oblast, Russia

Chernogolovka Черноголовка
- Town
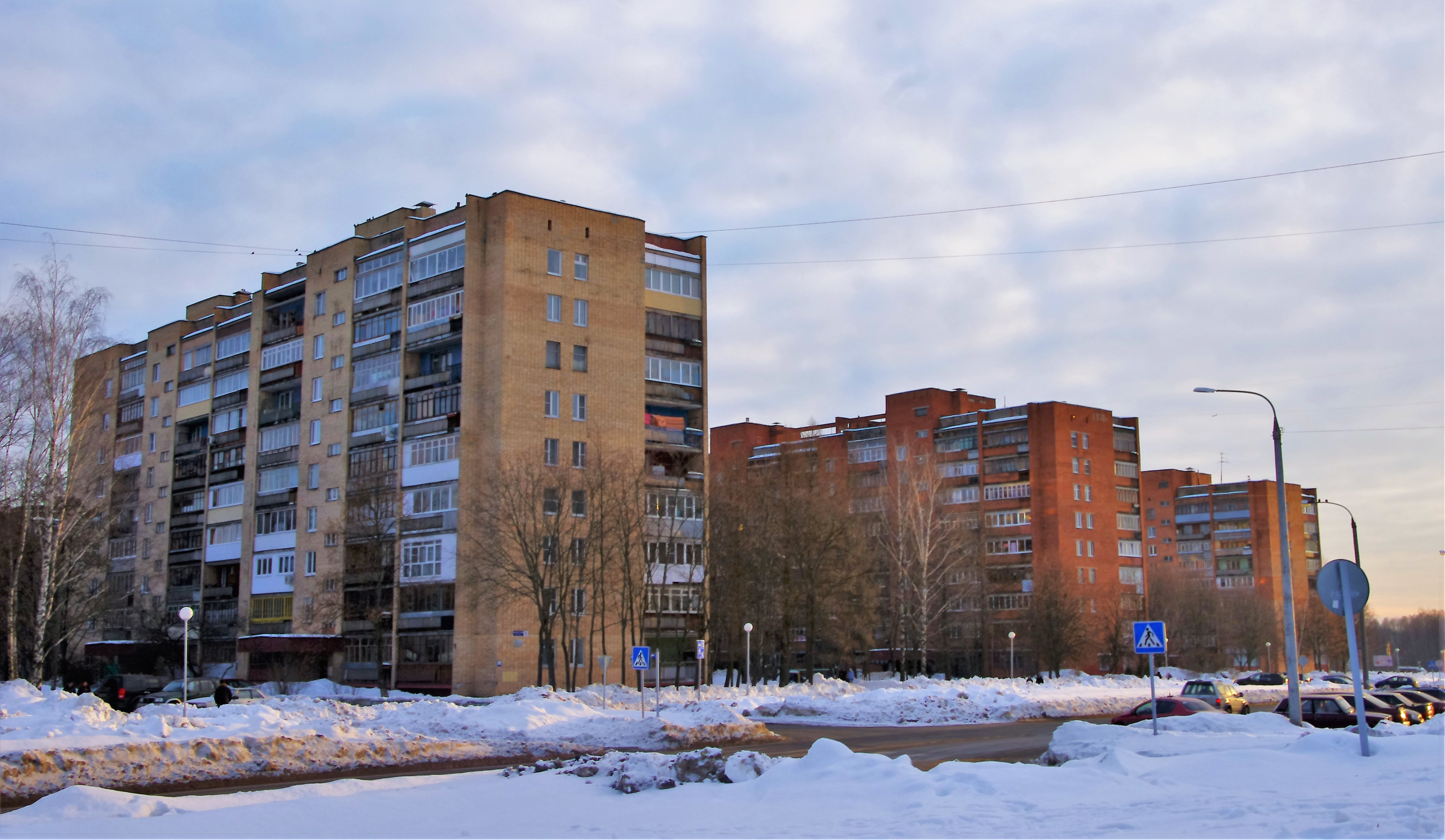

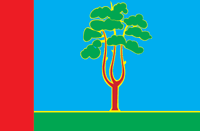
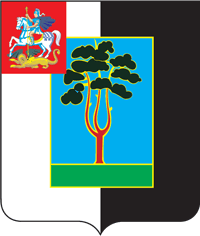
- Flag Coat of arms
- Interactive map of Chernogolovka
- Location of Chernogolovka Chernogolovka (Moscow Oblast)
- Coordinates: 56°00′N 38°22′E
- Country: Russia
- Federal subject: Moscow Oblast
- First mentioned: 1710
- Town status since: 2001

Government
  - Mayor: Oleg Egorov
- Elevation: 150 m (490 ft)

Population (2010 Census)
  - Total: 20,983
  - Estimate (2025): 18,352 (−12.5%)

Administrative status
  - Subordinated to: Chernogolovka Town Under Oblast Jurisdiction
  - Capital of: Chernogolovka Town Under Oblast Jurisdiction

Municipal status
  - Urban okrug: Chernogolovka Urban Okrug
  - Capital of: Chernogolovka Urban Okrug
- Time zone: UTC+3 (MSK)
- Postal code: 142432
- Dialing code: +7 49652
- OKTMO ID: 46781000001
- Website: www.chernogolovka.net

Chernogolovka (Russian: Черноголо́вка) is a town in Moscow Oblast, Russia. Center of the town is located some 43 km (27 miles) northeast of the Moscow city limit and 59 km (37 miles) from Red Square. Its population in 2018 was 21,342.

== History ==
Chernogolovka for the first time has been officially mentioned in 1710. In 1956, Chernogolovka grew into a scientific center with the help of Nobel Prize winner Nikolay Semyonov. Semyonov started the experimental branch of Moscow Institute of Chemical Physics, which in the 1960s–1970s grew into a scientific center. In 2001, Chernogolovka was granted town status and given the further status as a naukograd or science city in 2008.

== Administrative and municipal status ==
Within the framework of administrative divisions, it is, together with nine rural localities, incorporated as Chernogolovka Town Under Oblast Jurisdiction—an administrative unit with the status equal to that of the districts. As a municipal division, Chernogolovka Town Under Oblast Jurisdiction is incorporated as Chernogolovka Urban Okrug.

== Transportation ==
Chernogolovka does not have a rail link but long-distance buses link the town to Moscow, Noginsk and Fryanovo.

== Research facilities ==
Chernogolovka is a major Russian center of scientific research. It is home to a number of research institutions of the Russian Academy of Sciences:

- Institute of Problems of Chemical Physics
- Institute of Solid State Physics
- Institute of Physiologically Active Compounds
- Institute of Microelectronics Technology and High Purity Materials
- Landau Institute for Theoretical Physics
- Institute of Energy Problems for Chemical Physics
- Institute of Experimental Mineralogy
- Institute of Structural Macrokinetics and Materials Science

It is also the home of Ost-Company, which produces a broad range of alcoholic and non-alcoholic drinks which are exported worldwide. Napitki iz Chernogolovki, and others.
