= Type-II superconductor =

Material that can form magnetic vortices

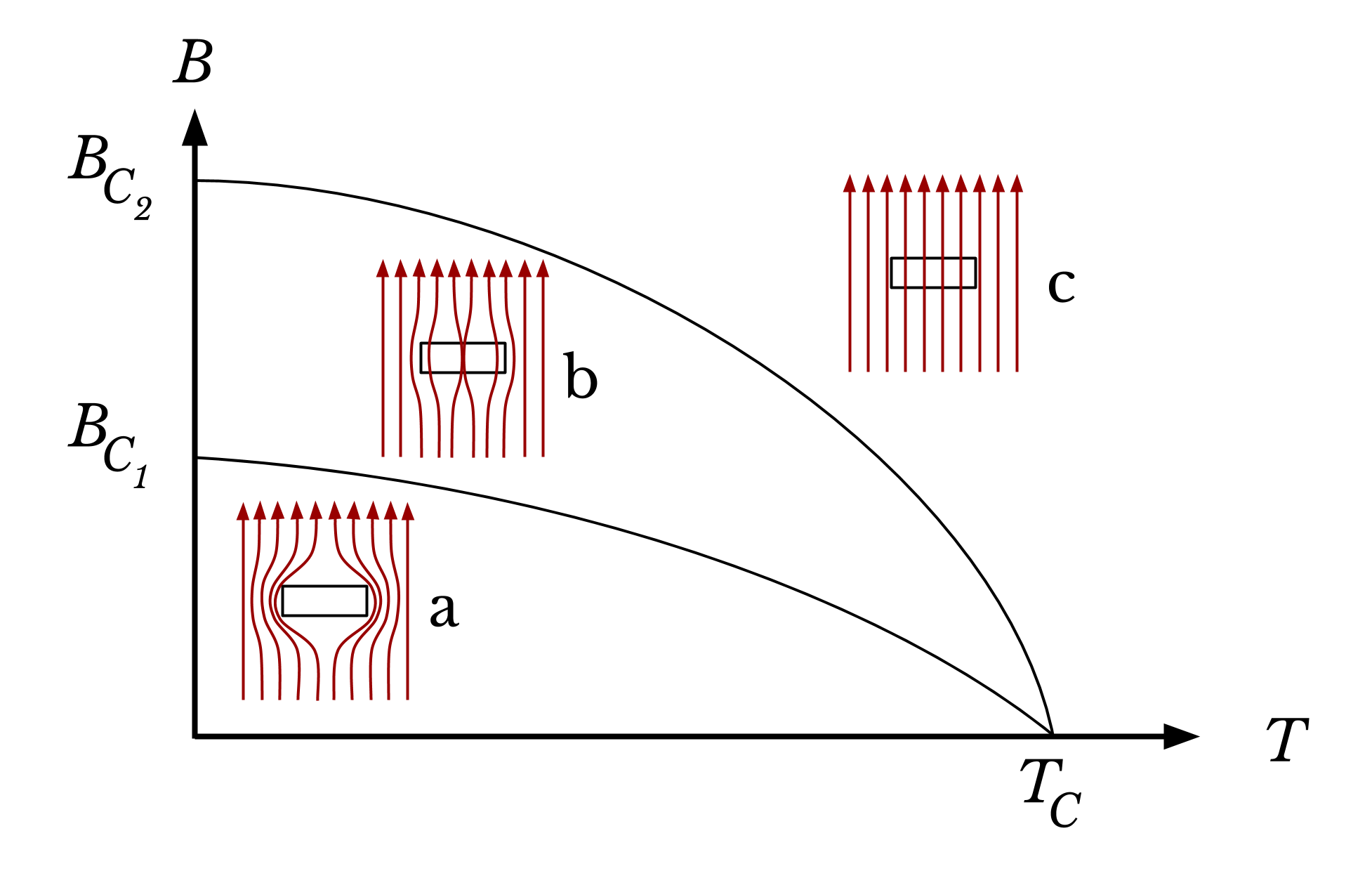
Superconductive behavior under varying magnetic field and temperature. The graph shows magnetic flux B as a function of absolute temperature T. Critical magnetic flux densities B_{C1} and B_{C2} and the critical temperature T_{C} are labeled. In the lower region of this graph, both type-I and type-II superconductors display the Meissner effect (a). A mixed state (b), in which some field lines are captured in magnetic field vortices, occurs only in Type-II superconductors within a limited region of the graph. Beyond this region, the superconductive property breaks down, and the material behaves as a normal conductor (c).

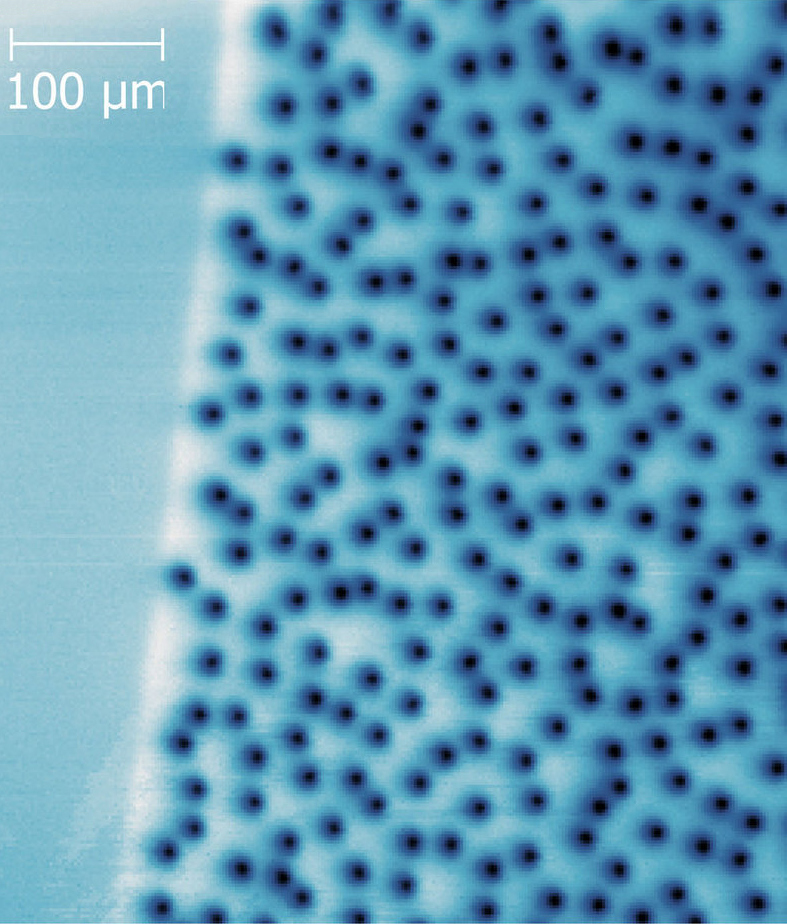
Quantum vortices in a 200-nm-thick YBCO film imaged by scanning SQUID microscopy

In superconductivity, a type-II superconductor is a superconductor that exhibits an intermediate phase of mixed ordinary and superconducting properties at intermediate temperature and fields above the superconducting phases. It also features the formation of magnetic field vortices with an applied external magnetic field. This occurs above a certain critical field strength H_{c1}. The vortex density increases with increasing field strength. At a higher critical field H_{c2}, typically of the order of tens of teslas superconductivity is destroyed. Type-II superconductors do not exhibit a complete Meissner effect.

== History ==
The existence of two critical fields in superconducting alloys was experimentally observed by Wander Johannes De Haas and J. Voogd in 1929–1931, and confirmed by multiple authors working with different materials over the following years. However, the sample inhomogeneities in these early studies were poorly controlled, and it was assumed that the effect might be explained by structural inhomogenuities which would lead to a formation of a thin filamentary superconducting network. In 1936, Lev Shubnikov, Vladimir Khotkevich, Georgy Shepelev and Yuri Rjabinin produced high-quality single-crystal samples and concluded that the effect was a bulk phenomenon, ruling out structural inhomogeneity as the cause. The following year, Shubnikov was executed during Stalin's purges and his results remained largely unknown for the next 25 years.

In 1950, the theory of the two types of superconductors was developed by Lev Landau and Vitaly Ginzburg in their paper on Ginzburg–Landau theory. In their argument, a type-I superconductor had positive free energy of the superconductor-normal metal boundary. Ginzburg and Landau pointed out the possibility of type-II superconductors that should form inhomogeneous state in strong magnetic fields. However, at that time, all known superconductors were type-I, and they commented that there was no experimental motivation to consider precise structure of type-II superconducting state. The theory for the behavior of the type-II superconducting state in magnetic field was greatly improved by Alexei Alexeyevich Abrikosov, who was elaborating on the ideas by Lars Onsager and Richard Feynman of quantum vortices in superfluids. Abrikosov compared his vortex lattice theory to Shubnikov's 1936 experiments and found a good fit. Quantum vortex solution in a superconductor is also very closely related to Fritz London's work on magnetic flux quantization in superconductors. The Nobel Prize in Physics was awarded for the theory of type-II superconductivity in 2003.

== Vortex state ==
Ginzburg–Landau theory introduced the superconducting coherence length ξ in addition to London magnetic field penetration depth λ. According to Ginzburg–Landau theory, in a type-II superconductor $\lambda/\xi >1/\sqrt{2}$. Ginzburg and Landau showed that this leads to negative energy of the interface between superconducting and normal phases. The existence of the negative interface energy was also known since the mid-1930s from the early works by the London brothers. A negative interface energy suggests that the system should be unstable against maximizing the number of such interfaces. This instability was not observed until the experiments of Shubnikov in 1936 where two critical fields were found.

In 1952 an observation of type-II superconductivity was also reported by Zavaritskii. Fritz London demonstrated that a magnetic flux can penetrate a superconductor via a topological defect that has integer phase winding and carries quantized magnetic flux. Onsager and Feynman demonstrated that quantum vortices should form in superfluids.

A 1957 paper by A. A. Abrikosov generalizes these ideas. In the limit of very short coherence length the vortex solution is identical to London's fluxoid, where the vortex core is approximated by a sharp cutoff rather than a gradual vanishing of superconducting condensate near the vortex center. Abrikosov found that the vortices arrange themselves into a regular array known as a vortex lattice. Near a so-called upper critical magnetic field, the problem of a superconductor in an external field is equivalent to the problem of vortex state in a rotating superfluid, discussed by Lars Onsager and Richard Feynman.

=== Flux pinning ===
Position memory due to vortex pinning in a high temperature superconductor

In the vortex state, a phenomenon known as flux pinning becomes possible. This is not possible with type-I superconductors, since they cannot be penetrated by magnetic fields.

If a superconductor is cooled in a field, the field can be trapped, which can allow the superconductor to be suspended over a magnet, with the potential for a frictionless joint or bearing. The worth of flux pinning is seen through many implementations such as lifts, frictionless joints, and transportation. The thinner the superconducting layer, the stronger the pinning that occurs when exposed to magnetic fields.

== Materials ==
Type-II superconductors are usually made of metal alloys or complex oxide ceramics. All high-temperature superconductors are type-II superconductors. While most elemental superconductors are type-I, niobium, vanadium, and technetium are elemental type-II superconductors. Boron-doped diamond and silicon are also type-II superconductors. Metal alloy superconductors can also exhibit type-II behavior (e.g., niobium–titanium, one of the most common superconductors in applied superconductivity), as well as intermetallic compounds like niobium–tin.

Other type-II examples are the cuprate-perovskite ceramic materials which have achieved the highest superconducting critical temperatures. These include La_{1.85}Ba_{0.15}CuO_{4}, BSCCO, and YBCO (Yttrium-Barium-Copper-Oxide), which is famous as the first material to achieve superconductivity above the boiling point of liquid nitrogen (77 K). Due to strong vortex pinning, the cuprates are close to ideally hard superconductors.

== Important uses ==
Strong superconducting electromagnets (used in MRI scanners, NMR machines, and particle accelerators) often use coils wound of niobium-titanium wires or, for higher fields, niobium-tin wires. These materials are type-II superconductors with substantial upper critical field H_{c2}, and in contrast to, for example, the cuprate superconductors with even higher H_{c2}, they can be easily machined into wires. Recently, however, 2nd generation superconducting tapes are allowing replacement of cheaper niobium-based wires with much more expensive, but superconductive at much higher temperatures and magnetic fields "2nd generation" tapes.
