= Konstantin Novoselov =

Russian–British physicist

Sir Konstantin Novoselov FRS FInstP FRSC
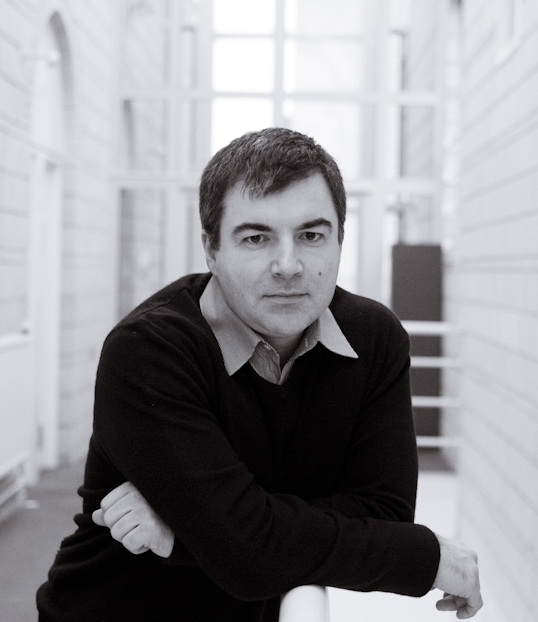
- Novoselov in 2013
- Born: Konstantin Sergeevich Novoselov; 23 August 1974 (age 52); Nizhny Tagil, Russian SFSR, Soviet Union
- Other name: Kostya Novoselov
- Education: Moscow Institute of Physics and Technology; Radboud University of Nijmegen (PhD)
- Known for: graphene
- Spouse: Irina Barbolina
- Awards: Nicholas Kurti Prize (2007); TR35 (2008); EuroPhysics Prize (2008); IUPAP Prize (2008); Nobel Prize in Physics (2010); Knight Commander of the Order of the Netherlands Lion (2010); FRS (2011); Knight Bachelor (2012); Leverhulme Medal (2013); Onsager Medal (2014); Carbon Medal (2016); Dalton Medal (2016); HonFRSC; HonFInstP; Member of the National Academy of Sciences; (2019)
- Scientific career
- Fields: Solid-state physics
- Workplaces: National University of Singapore; University of Manchester; Moscow Institute of Physics and Technology; Radboud University of Nijmegen
- Thesis: Development and Applications of Mesoscopic Hall Microprobes (2004)
- Doctoral advisor: Jan Kees Maan; Andre Geim
- Website: www.eng.nus.edu.sg/mse/staff/novoselov-konstantin-sergeevich

Sir Konstantin Sergeevich Novoselov (Russian: Константи́н Серге́евич Новосёлов, IPA: [kənstɐnʲˈtʲin sʲɪrˈɡʲe(j)ɪvʲɪtɕ nəvɐˈsʲɵləf]; born 23 August 1974) is a Russian–British physicist. His work on graphene with Andre Geim earned them the Nobel Prize in Physics in 2010. Novoselov is a professor at the Centre for Advanced 2D Materials, National University of Singapore and is also the Langworthy Professor of the School of Physics and Astronomy at the University of Manchester, and serves as President of Constructor University in Bremen, Germany.

== Education ==
Konstantin Novoselov was born in Nizhny Tagil, Soviet Union, in 1974. He graduated from the Moscow Institute of Physics and Technology with a MSc degree in 1997, and was awarded a PhD from the Radboud University of Nijmegen in 2004 for work supervised by Andre Geim.

Novoselov uses the nickname "Kostya" (diminutive of the name Konstantin).

== Career ==
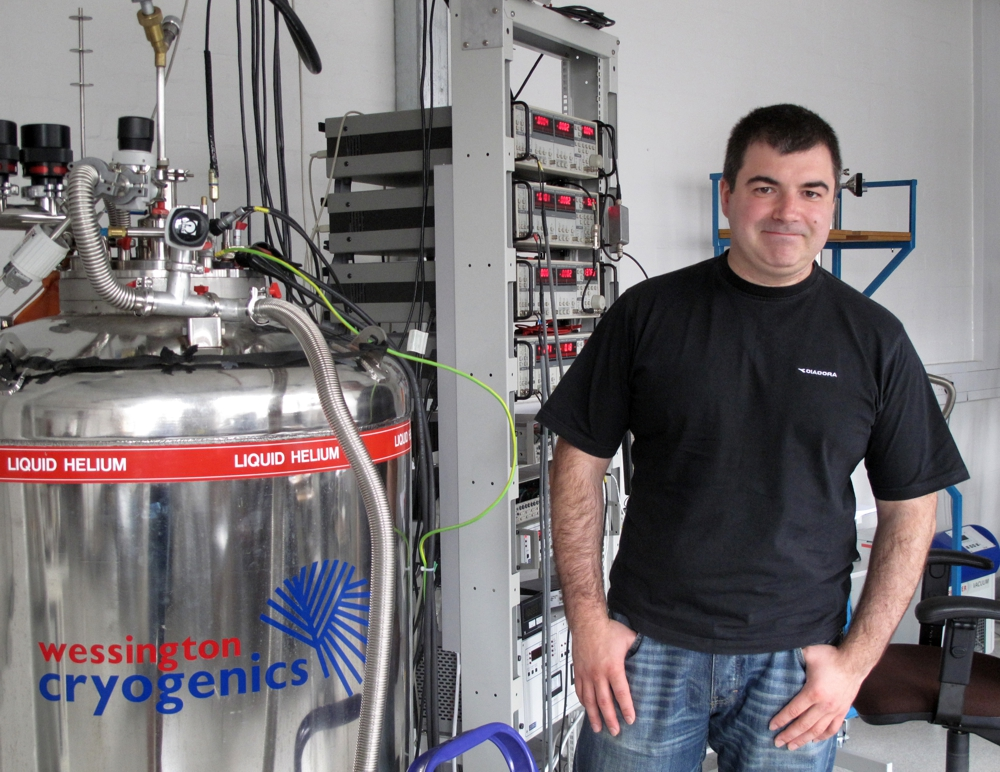
Konstantin Novoselov in his lab

Novoselov has published 475 peer-reviewed research papers on several topics including mesoscopic superconductivity (Hall magnetometry) as of January 2024 subatomic movements of magnetic domain walls, the discovery of gecko tape and graphene.^{,}

Kostya Novoselov participated in the Graphene Flagship project – a €1 billion initiative of the European Commission – and was featured in the official promotion movie of the project.

Novoselov was the first Director of the National Graphene Institute and sits on the International Scientific Advisory Committee of Australia's ARC Centre of Excellence in Future Low-Energy Electronics Technologies.

Novoselov was also a recipient of a starting grant from the European Research Council.

Kostya Novoselov made it into a shortlist of scientists with multiple hot papers for the years 2007–2008 (shared second place with 13 hot papers) and 2009 (5th place with 12 hot papers).

In 2014 Kostya Novoselov was included in the list of the most highly cited researchers. He was also named among the 17 hottest researchers worldwide—"individuals who have published the greatest number of hot papers during 2012–2013".

Novoselov joined the National University of Singapore's Centre for Advanced 2D Materials in 2019, making him the first Nobel laureate to join a Singaporean university. In 2021, he pioneered with Antonio H. Castro Neto a new research centre at the National University of Singapore called IFIM. With $200 million in funding over 10 years provided by the Ministry of Education and NUS, the centre will work on making ground-breaking discoveries into what are called functional intelligent materials.

== Awards and honours ==
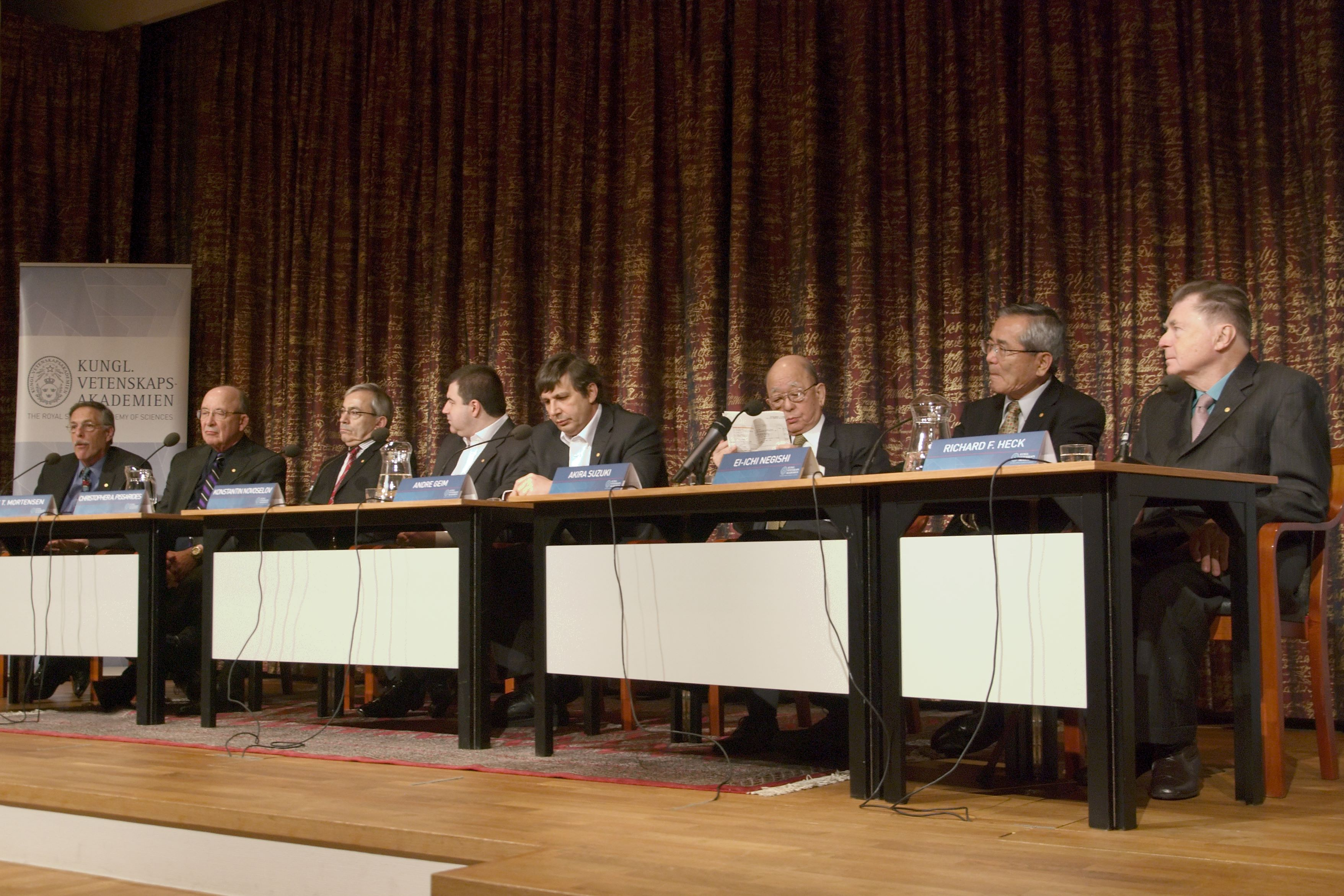
Peter Diamond, Dale T. Mortensen, Christopher A. Pissarides, Konstantin Novoselov, Andre Geim, Akira Suzuki, Ei-ichi Negishi, and Richard Heck, Nobel Prize Laureates 2010, at a press conference at the Royal Swedish Academy of Sciences in Stockholm.

- 2007 Nicholas Kurti European Science Prize "to promote and recognise the novel work of young scientists working in the fields of Low Temperatures and/or High Magnetic Fields."
- 2008 Technology Review-35 Young Innovator
- 2008 University of Manchester Researcher of the Year.
- 2008 Europhysics Prize, jointly with Geim, "for discovering and isolating a single free-standing atomic layer of carbon (graphene) and elucidating its remarkable electronic properties."^{,}
- 2008 International Union of Pure and Applied Physics Young Scientist Prize, "for his contribution in the discovery of graphene and for pioneering studies of its extraordinary properties."
- 2010 Nobel Prize in Physics, jointly with Andre Geim, "for groundbreaking experiments regarding the material graphene." Novoselov was the youngest Nobel laureate in physics since Brian Josephson in 1973, and in any field since Rigoberta Menchú (Peace) in 1992.
- 2010 Knight Commander of the Order of the Netherlands Lion
- 2010 Honorary Fellow of the Royal Society of Chemistry (HonFRSC)
- 2010 Honorary Professor of Moscow Institute of Physics and Technology
- 2011 Honorary Doctorate from the University of Manchester
- 2011 Honorary Fellow of the Institute of Physics (HonFInstP)
- 2011 Elected Fellow of the Royal Society (FRS)
- 2011 W. L. Bragg Lecture Prize from the International Union of Crystallography "... for his work on two-dimensional atomic crystals”
- 2012 Knight Bachelor in the 2012 New Year Honours for services to science.^{,}
- 2012 Chosen among "Britain's 50 New Radicals" by NESTA and The Observer
- 2012 The Kohn Prize Lecture “...for development of new class of materials: two-dimensional atomic crystals”
- 2013 Appointed Langworthy Professor of Physics, University of Manchester.
- 2013 Leverhulme Medal (Royal Society) "...for revolutionary work on graphene, other two-dimensional crystals and their heterostructures that has great potential for a number of applications, from electronics to energy"
- 2013 Awarded Honorary Freedom of the City of Manchester "for his groundbreaking work on graphene", see List of Freedom of the City recipients
- 2013 Elected a foreign member of the Bulgarian Academy of Sciences
- 2014 2nd place in the Discovery Section of the National Science Photography Competition.
- 2014 included in a list of the most highly cited researchers. He was also named among the 17 hottest researchers worldwide – "individuals who have published the greatest number of hot papers during 2012–2013".
- 2014 awarded the Onsager Medal.
- 2015 elected as a member of the Academia Europaea.
- 2016 awarded the Carbon Medal.
- 2016 awarded the Dalton Medal.
- 2016 elected as a member of the European Academy of Sciences and Arts
- 2019 elected a foreign associate of the US National Academy of Sciences
- 2019 elected as a member of the Asia Pacific Academy of Materials
- 2019 Otto Warburg Prize and Lecture by The Otto Warburg Chemistry Foundation "for the discovery of the unusual quantum properties of one atom thick two-dimensional materials"
- 2022 awarded John von Neumann Professor title. The title is awarded jointly by the Budapest University of Technology and Economics (BME) and the John von Neumann Computer Society
- 2023 elected as a foreign member of the Chinese Academy of Sciences
- 2022 Fray International Sustainability Award
- 2023 Kublai Khan Medal of the Mongolian Academy of Sciences
- 2023 Nano-Materials Science Award
- 2024 Contribution to Knowledge Platinum Medal Award (joint with Andre Geim) from the Institute of Materials, Minerals and Mining
- 2026 the first-ever EPFL Fellow, inaugurating a new honorary title created to recognize eminent scientific personalities of exceptional international stature. Professor Konstantin Novoselov is affiliated as an EPFL Fellow with the Institute of Physics in the School of Basic Sciences
- 2026 elected as a Singapore National Academy of Science (SNAS) Fellow
- 2026 appointed as the first Honorary Fellow of the Italian Academy of Engineering and Technology (ITATEC)
- 2026 awarded the IPS President Medal by the Institute of Physics Singapore (IPS)

== National Graphene Institute ==
Novoselov led the academic team which overviewed the design, construction and launching of the National Graphene Institute. He contributed with a number of unique architectural and technical solutions. The veil of the National Graphene Institute depicts formulae from his and Prof. A. Geim early works on graphene. Also, Novoselov confirms that among the formulae several scientific jokes are hidden, though he has never revealed them.

He co-authored a book on the architecture of the National Graphene Institute.

== Other projects ==
In 2018, in a project of exploration of the archives of the Jodrell Bank Observatory, Prof. Novoselov helped Prof. Tim O'Brian to transcribe radio transmission (most possibly simulated instrument reading) from the Soviet Zond 6 received by radio telescope at Jodrell Bank Observatory in November 1968.^{,}

== Legacy ==
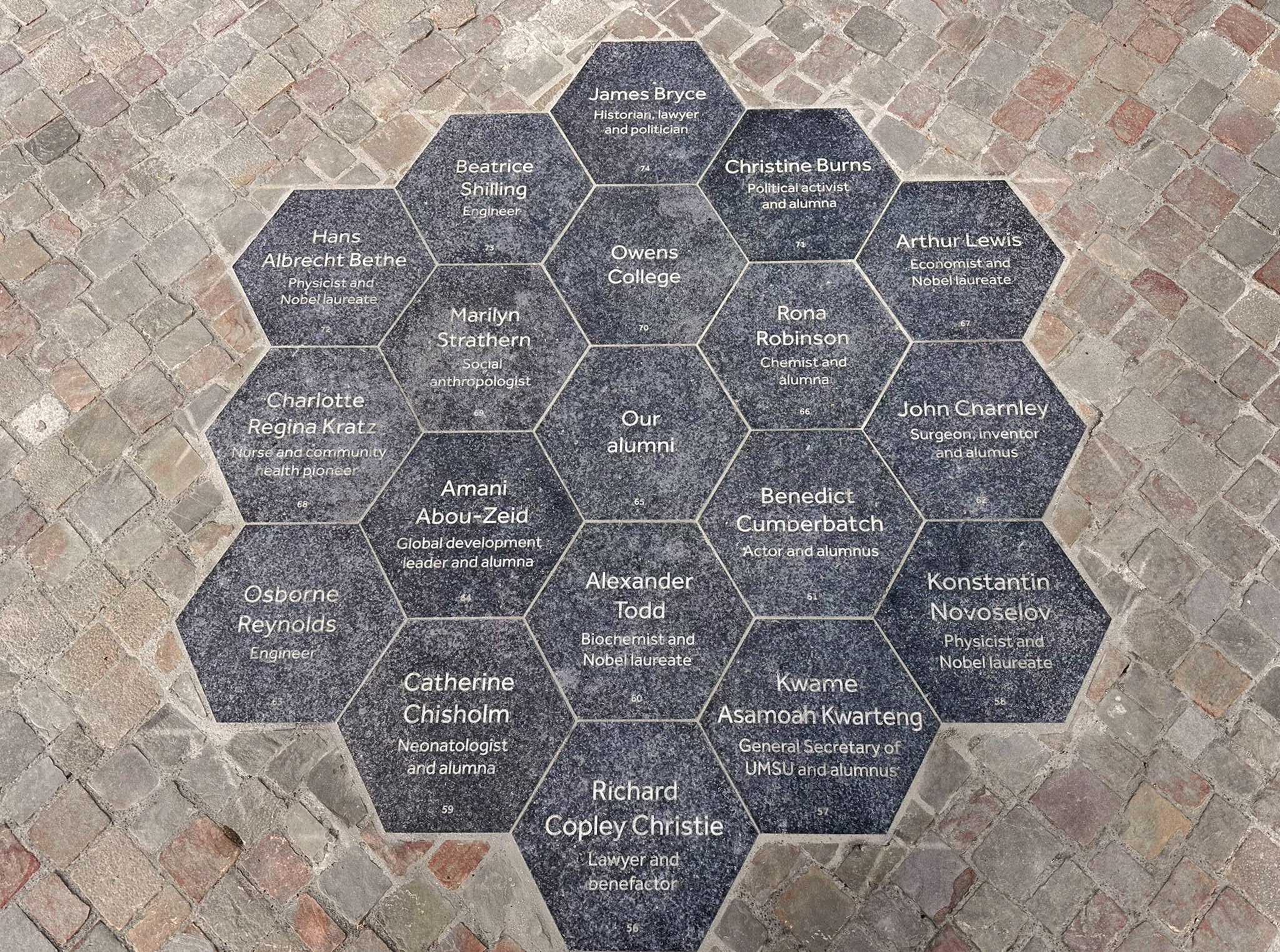
Novoselov's name in the Manchester University notable alumni pavement

- Novoselov International Materials Award - the award has been established in honor of the lifetime achievements of Prof. Sir, Konstantin Novoselov. The purpose of this Award is to acknowledge the extraordinary and groundbreaking scientific achievements from scientists and engineers in the field of Materials, within the FLOGEN Sustainability Framework. The Award Citation reads:

"For Leadership in developing and applying new materials methods and technologies for a sustainable development in the environmental, economic, and social points of view".

- Novoselov received a named plaque in the Bicentenary Way - notable alumni pavement at the University of Manchester.
- In 2026 Konstantin Novoselov received a named bench at the National Central University in Taiwan.

== Art involvement ==
Novoselov is known for his interest in art. He practices in Chinese traditional drawing and has been involved in several projects on modern art. Thus, in February 2015 he combined forces with Cornelia Parker to create a display for the opening of the Whitworth Art Gallery. Cornelia Parker's meteorite shower firework (pieces of meteorites loaded in firework) was launched by Novoselov breathing on graphene gas sensor (which changed the resistance of graphene due to doping by water vapour). Graphene was obtained through exfoliation of graphite which was extracted from a drawing of William Blake. Novoselov suggested that he also exfoliated graphite obtained from the drawings of other prominent artists: John Constable, Pablo Picasso, J. M. W. Turner, Thomas Girtin. He said that only microscopic amounts (flake size less than 100 micrometres) was extracted from each of the drawings. In 2015 he participated in "in conversation" session with Douglas Gordon during Interdependence session at Manchester International Festival.

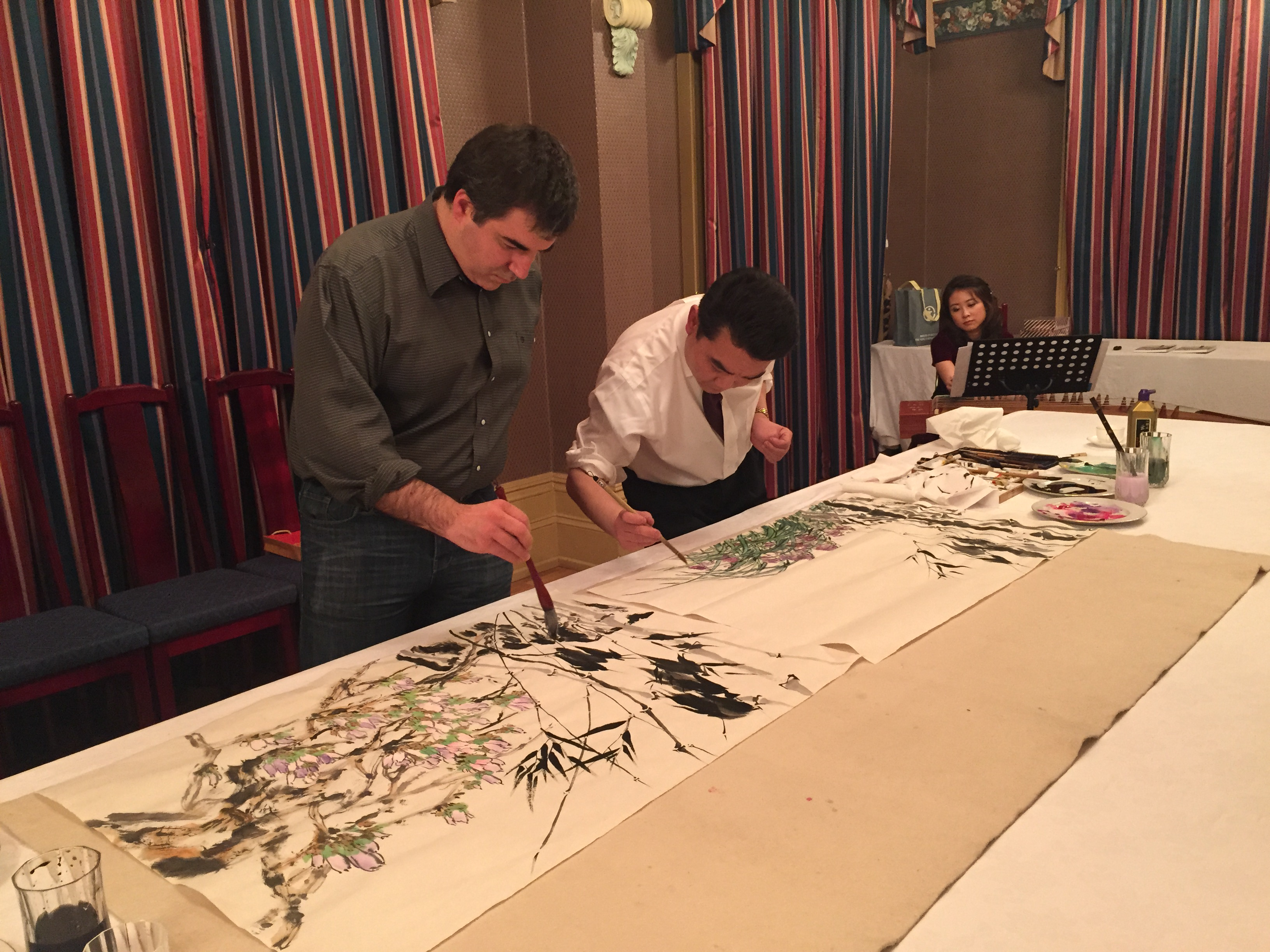
Novoselov while painting at the residence of Chinese Consul General Li in Manchester.

He also participates in discussions on the relation between art and science. Novoselov believes that artists and scientists both rely on curiosity, willingness to learn and imagination:

Artists and scientists both think outside the box. They've got to come with genius experiments or ideas to expose the most interesting phenomena. Later, they've got to diverge a little bit because scientists will start to look at the common elements between many of the phenomena to describe the most general law, and artists will probably try to study individuals rather than the crowd as a whole. But we're just two sides of the same medal.

Novoselov is fond of Chinese calligraphy and drawing. He learned it from a prominent Chinese artist Zheng Shenglong. Nine ink paintings by Prof. Novoselov were shown at the exhibition "Britain Through the Eyes of a Chinese Diplomat" at the University of Leeds. One of his paintings is now in the collection of Xi Jinping, the General Secretary of the Chinese Communist Party since 2012.

Novoselov participated in Viennacontemporary in 2017, where 5 of his works have been presented by RDI.Creative gallery. The paintings presented a range of topics, from the very traditional Chinese paintings to landscapes to contemporary subjects. It is claimed that graphene ink has been used in at least some of those paintings.

In 2025, Novoselov curated an exhibition at Venice Biennale.

== Personal life ==
Novoselov holds both Russian and British citizenship. He is married and has two daughters. He is an agnostic.

== Political positions ==
In February 2022, he signed an open letter by Russian scientists condemning the 2022 Russian invasion of Ukraine.

Academic offices
Preceded by Andre Geim	Langworthy Professor at the University of Manchester; 2013–present	Succeeded by Incumbent
