= Centre for Advanced 2D Materials =

Singaporean research institute

Coordinates: 1.29704°N 103.7785°E

Centre for Advanced 2D Materials (CA2DM)
- Type: Research institute
- Established: 2010; 16 years ago
- Director: Antonio H. Castro Neto
- Location: Singapore, Singapore
- Affiliation: National University of Singapore
- Website: graphene.nus.edu.sg

The Centre for Advanced 2D Materials (CA2DM), at the National University of Singapore (NUS), is the first centre in Asia dedicated to graphene research. The centre was established under the scientific advice of two Nobel Laureates in physics – Prof Andre Geim and Prof Konstantin Novoselov - who won the 2010 Nobel Prize in Physics for their discovery of graphene. It was created for the conception, characterization, theoretical modeling, and development of transformative technologies based on two-dimensional crystals, such as graphene. In 2019, Prof Konstantin Novoselov moved to Singapore and joined NUS as Distinguished Professor of Materials Science and Engineering.

== History and funding ==
CA2DM had its beginnings in 2010 as the Graphene Research Centre (GRC), which NUS established under the leadership of Prof. Antonio H. Castro Neto, with a start-up fund from NUS of S$40 Million, 1,000 m2 of laboratory space, and a state-of-the-art clean room facility of 800 m2. In June 2012, the GRC announced the opening of a S$15 Million micro and nano fabrication facility to produce graphene products. Then in 2014, research activities in the GRC expanded to other 2D materials such as 2D transition metal dichalcogenides. To better reflect the research activities, the GRC was renamed the Centre for Advanced 2D Materials (CA2DM), and became an NRF “Medium-Sized Centre", with a S$50 Million grant. Speaking of commercial application today scientists are using graphene for making synthetic blood and developing non-invasive treatments for cancer. Graphene would soon replace silicon in your computer chips thus resulting in a much faster, unbreakable tablets, phone and others; CA2DM is also participating on a S$50 Million CREATE grant from NRF, together with University of California, Berkeley and Nanyang Technological University, for the study of new photovoltaic systems based on two-dimensional crystals.

== Research ==
The target areas of intervention of the NUS Centre for Advanced 2D Materials are

=== Graphene Research ===
Principal Investigator(s): Barbaros Özyilmaz

Research areas include:

- Atomically thin, wafer size, crystal growth, and characterization: Raman, AFM, TEM, STM, magneto transport, angle resolved photoemission (ARPES), optics.
- Three-dimensional architectures based on atomically thin films (atomic multi-layers, see figure).
- Composite materials where accumulated stress could be monitored by contactless, non-invasive, optical methods.
- Spintronics and valleytronics in two-dimensional materials.
- Graphene-ferroelectric memories (G-FeRAM), graphene spin torque transistors (G-STT).

=== 2D Materials Research ===
Principal Investigator(s): Loh Kian Ping

Research areas include:

- Atomically thin, wafer size, crystal growth, and characterization: Raman, AFM, TEM, STM, magneto transport, angle resolved photoemission (ARPES), optics.
- Three-dimensional architectures based on atomically thin films (atomic multi-layers, see figure).
- Composite materials where accumulated stress could be monitored by contactless, non-invasive, optical methods.
- Spintronics and valleytronics in two-dimensional materials.

=== 2D Device Research ===
Principal Investigator(s): Lim Chwee Teck

Research areas include:

- Flexible electronics and strain engineering of atomically thin materials.
- Mechanics of atomically thin film transfer.
- Nano-scale patterning and new device development.
- Atomically thin electrodes for photovoltaic or OLED applications.
- Atomically thin gas barriers and electrodes for energy/charge transfer and storage (water splitting, fuel cells, etc.).
- Solution-processed atomically thin substrates for bio applications and catalysis.
- Atomically thin films as optical components in fiber lasers (mode locking, polarizers etc.).
- Atomically thin film platforms for bio-sensing and stem cell growth.
- Atomically thin film platforms for sol-gel, organic, and electro-chemistry.

=== Theory Group ===
Principal Investigator(s): Feng Yuan Ping

Research areas include:

- Computational modeling of new atomically thin materials and complex architectures.
- Spintronics and valleytronics in two-dimensional materials.
