= Irina Grigorieva =

Irina Grigorieva may refer to:

- Irina Grigorieva (academic), physics professor
- Irina Grigorieva (footballer)
