= Carbon Medal =

Medal of achievement in carbon science and technology

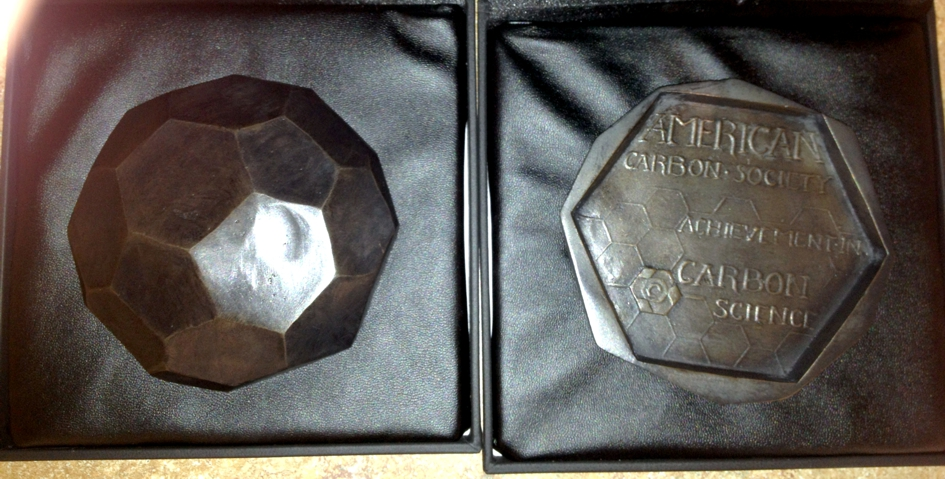
Carbon Medal.

The Carbon Medal is a medal of achievement in carbon science and technology given by the American Carbon Society for the "... outstanding contributions to the discovery of novel carbon products or processes."

== Awardees ==
The following have won the Carbon Medal:

- 1997 Robert Curl (Rice University, co-discoverer of fullerene)
- 1997 Harry Kroto (University of Sussex, co-discoverer of fullerene)
- 1997 Richard Smalley (Rice University, co-discoverer of fullerene)
- 2001 Mildred Dresselhaus (MIT, researcher of carbon nanotubes)
- 2004 Donald S. Bethune (IBM research, researcher of single-walled carbon nanotubes)
- 2004 Morinobu Endo (Shinshu University, one of the pioneers of carbon nanofibers and carbon nanotubes synthesis)
- 2004 Sumio Iijima (NEC, often cited as the inventor of carbon nanotubes)
- 2016 Andre Geim (University of Manchester, co-inventor of graphene)
- 2016 Konstantin Novoselov (University of Manchester, co-inventor of graphene)
