= Langworthy Professor =

The Langworthy Professor is the holder of an endowed chair in the School of Physics and Astronomy at the University of Manchester, UK. It was amongst the world's first professorships in physics as a dedicated subject and has been held by many eminent scientists. Several Langworthy Professors have been Nobel Laureates, including Ernest Rutherford, Lawrence Bragg, Patrick Blackett, Andre Geim and Konstantin Novoselov.

== History ==
It was founded by a bequest of £10,000 for the purpose of endowing a professorship of experimental physics by the businessman and politician E. R. Langworthy at Owens College, Manchester in 1874. Owens College later became the Victoria University of Manchester (1904) and then the University of Manchester (2004).

== Langworthy Professors ==
- 1874–87 Balfour Stewart
- 1887–1907 Sir Arthur Schuster
- 1907–19 Sir Ernest Rutherford
- 1919–37 Sir William Lawrence Bragg
- 1937–53 Patrick Blackett
- 1955–60 Samuel Devons
- 1961–72 Brian Flowers
- 1987–90 Francis Graham-Smith
- 1998–2001 Frank Read
- 2001–07 Andrew Lyne
- 2007–13 Sir Andre Geim
- 2013–present Sir Konstantin Novoselov
