= Sumio Iijima =

Japanese nanotechnologist (born 1939)

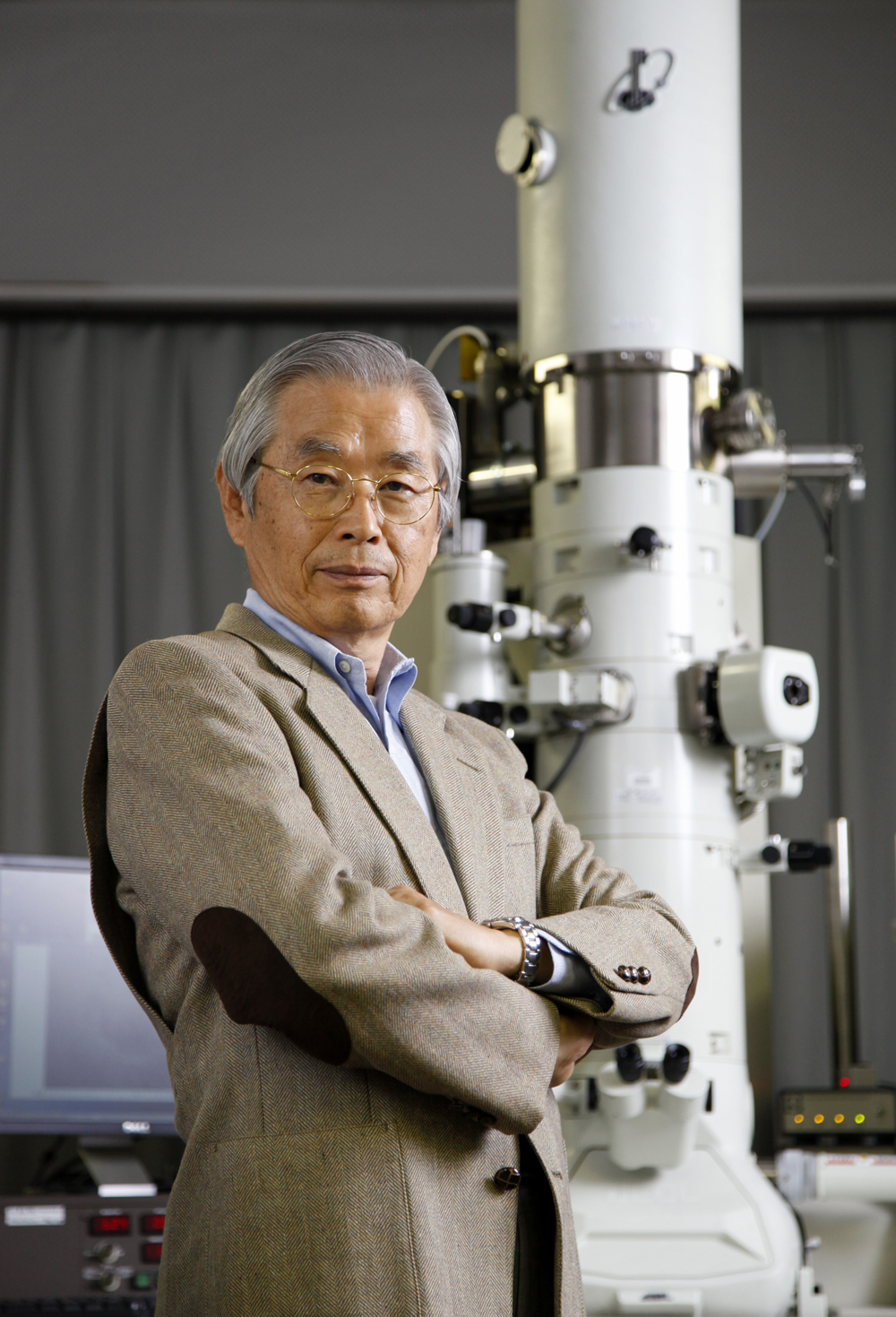
- Iijima at Meijo University
- Born: 2 May 1939 (age 87); Koshigaya, Saitama, Japan
- Education: Tohoku University; University of Electro-Communications
- Known for: High resolution electron microscope and Carbon nanotubes
- Awards: See below
- Scientific career
- Fields: Nanotechnology
- Workplaces: NEC Corporation; Meijo University; Nagoya University

Sumio Iijima (飯島 澄男, Iijima Sumio; born 2 May 1939) is a Japanese physicist and inventor, often cited for his discovery of carbon nanotubes. Although carbon nanotubes had been observed prior to his "invention", Iijima's 1991 paper generated unprecedented interest in the carbon nanostructures and has since fueled intense research in the area of nanotechnology.

Born in Saitama Prefecture in 1939, Iijima graduated with a Bachelor of Engineering degree in 1963 from the University of Electro-Communications, Tokyo. He received a Master's degree in 1965 and completed his Ph.D. in solid-state physics in 1968, both at Tohoku University in Sendai.

Between 1970 and 1982 he performed research with crystalline materials and high-resolution electron microscopy at Arizona State University. He visited the University of Cambridge during 1979 to perform studies on carbon materials.

He worked for the Research Development Corporation of Japan from 1982 to 1987, studying ultra-fine particles, after which he joined NEC Corporation where he is still employed. He discovered carbon nanotubes in 1991. When he discovered carbon nanotubes, he not only took pictures of them but he put two together and explained what they really are. Afterwards, he was credited with the discovery. He is also a University Professor at Meijo University since 1999. Furthermore, he is the Honorary AIST Fellow of the National Institute of Advanced Industrial Science and Technology, Distinguished Invited University Professor of Nagoya University.

He was awarded the Benjamin Franklin Medal in Physics in 2002, "for the discovery and elucidation of the atomic structure and helical character of multi-wall and single-wall carbon nanotubes, which have had an enormous impact on the rapidly growing condensed matter and materials science field of nanoscale science and electronics."

He is a foreign associate of National Academy of Sciences, foreign member of the Norwegian Academy of Science and Letters. He is also a Member of the Japan Academy.

== Research fields ==
Nano Science, Crystallography, Electron Microscopy, Solid-State Physics, Materials Science

== Professional record ==
- 1968 – 1974: Research Associate, Research Institute for Scientific Measurements, Tohoku University, Sendai
- 1970 – 1977: Research Associate, Department of Physics, Arizona State University, Tempe, Arizona
- 1977 – 1982: Senior Research Associate, Center for Solid State Science, Arizona State University, Tempe, Arizona
- 1979: Visiting Senior Scientist, Department of Metallurgy and Materials Science, University of Cambridge, Cambridge
- 1982 – 1987: Group Leader, ERATO Program, Research Development Corporation of Japan, Nagoya
- 1987 – Present: Senior Research Fellow, NEC Corporation, Tsukuba (Joined NEC in 1987 as Senior Principal Researcher)
- 1998 – 2002: Research Director, JST/ICORP "Nanotubulites" Project Tsukuba and Nagoya
- 1999 – Present: University Professor, Meijo University, Nagoya
- 2001 – 2015: Director, Nanotube Research Center, National Institute of Advanced Industrial Science and Technology (AIST), Tsukuba
- 2005 – 2012: Dean, SKKU Advanced Institute of Nanotechnology (SAINT, http://saint.skku.edu), Sungkyunkwan University, Suwon, Korea.
- 2006 – 2009: Project Leader, NEDO “Carbon Nanotube Capacitor Development Project”
- 2007 – Present: Distinguished University Professor of Nagoya University, Nagoya
- 2008 – 2012: Distinguished Invited Chair Professor for World Class University (WCU) Program, Sungkyunkwan University, Suwon, Korea.
- 2015 – Present: Honorary AIST Fellow, National Institute of Advanced Industrial Science and Technology (AIST)

== Academy ==
- 2007: Foreign Associate, The National Academy of Sciences
- 2009: Foreign Member, The Norwegian Academy of Science and Letters.
- 2010: Member, The Japan Academy
- 2011: Foreign Fellow, Chinese Academy of Sciences

== Recognition ==
=== Honors ===
- 2000: Fellow, The American Physical Society
- 2001: Honorary Fellowship, Royal Microscopical Society
- 2002: Honorary Doctor, University of Antwerp
- 2002: Honorary Member, The Crystallographic Society of Japan
- 2003: Honorary Doctor, École Polytechnique Fédérale de Lausanne(EPFL)
- 2004: Honorary Member, The Japanese Society of Microscopy
- 2005: Honorary Professor, Xi’an Jiaotong University
- 2005: Honorary Professor, Peking University
- 2007: Fellow, The Japan Society of Applied Physics
- 2009: Fellow, The Microscopy Society of America
- 2009: Honorary Member, The Chemical Society of Japan
- 2009: Honorary Professor, Tsinghua University
- 2009: Distinguished Professor, The University of Electro-Communications
- 2010: Honorary Professor, Zhejiang University
- 2010: Honorary Professor, Southeast University
- 2014: Honorary Doctor, Aalto University

=== Awards ===
- 1976: Bertram Eugene Warren Diffraction Physics Award, (The American Crystallography Society)
- 1985: Nishina Memorial Award, (The Nishina Memorial Foundation)
- 1996: Asahi Prize, (The Asahi Shinbun Cultural Foundation)
- 2002: Agilent EuroPhysics Prize, (European Physical Society)
- 2002: James C. McGroddy Prize for New Materials, (American Physical Society)
- 2002: Benjamin Franklin Medal in Physics, (The Franklin Institute)
- 2002: Japan Academy Award and Imperial Award, (The Japan Academy)
- 2003: Person of Cultural Merit, Japan
- 2004: The American Carbon Society Carbon Medal, (The American Carbon Society)
- 2007: Gregori Aminoff Prize in crystallography 2007, (Royal Swedish Academy of Sciences)
- 2007: Fujihara Award, (The Fujihara Foundation of Science)
- 2007: Balzan Prize for Nanoscience 2007
- 2008: The Kavli Prize Nanoscience 2008 (The Kavli Foundation)
- 2008: The Prince of Asturias Award for Technical Scientific Research 2008, (The Prince of Asturias Foundation)
- 2009: Order of Culture, Japan
- 2015: European Inventor Award (European Patent Office, Germany)
- 2016: Asian Scientist 100, Asian Scientist
- 2017: Sir C. V. Raman Visiting Professorship award for CNT (University of Madras, Chennai, India) during 6–13 March 2017.
- 2025: King Faisal Prize
