= Brian Flowers, Baron Flowers =

British physicist (1924–2010)

The Lord Flowers
- Portrait by Nick Sinclair, 1991

Vice-Chancellor of the University of London
- In office 1985–1990
- Preceded by: Randolph Quirk
- Succeeded by: Stewart Sutherland

Member of the House of Lords
- Lord Temporal
- Life peerage 20 February 1979 – 25 June 2010

Personal details
- Born: Brian Hilton Flowers; 13 September 1924 Blackburn, Lancashire, England
- Died: 25 June 2010 (aged 85)
- Spouse: Mary Frances Behrens (m. 1951)
- Education: Bishop Gore School
- Alma mater: Gonville and Caius College, Cambridge

Brian Hilton Flowers, Baron Flowers FRS (13 September 1924 – 25 June 2010) was a British physicist, academician, and public servant.

== Early life and studies ==
The son of the Rev. Harold Joseph Flowers and Mrs Marian Flowers, Brian Hilton Flowers was born in Blackburn, Lancashire. He was educated in Swansea at Bishop Gore School, where a teacher, Mr Foukes, encouraged his interest in physics. He went on to study at Gonville and Caius College, Cambridge, where he graduated in physics and electronics.

== Career ==
Flowers worked on the Anglo-Canadian Atomic Energy Project Tube Alloys at Chalk River, Ontario from 1944 to 1946, then joined the Atomic Energy Research Establishment (AERE) at Harwell, Oxfordshire until 1950 when he moved to the department of mathematical physics at the University of Birmingham.

In 1952, he became the head of the Theoretical physics division at AERE, holding this post until 1958. At the University of Manchester, he was Professor of theoretical physics from 1958 to 1961, Langworthy Professor of physics from 1961 to 1972 as well as chairman of the Science Research Council from 1967 to 1973. At the University of London, he was Rector of Imperial College London from 1973 to 1985 and finally vice-chancellor of the university from 1985 to 1990. Between 1994 and 2001, he was chancellor of the University of Manchester.

Flowers was chair of the Computer Board for Universities and Research Council from 1966 to 1970, member of the Atomic Energy Authority from 1971 to 1981, and president of the Institute of Physics from 1972 to 1974. He was further chair of the Royal Commission on Environmental Pollution from 1973 to 1976, president of the European Science Foundation from 1974 to 1980, and president of the National Society for Clean Air from 1977 to 1979. Between 1978 and 1981, Flowers was chair of the Commission on Energy and the Environment; between 1979 and 1980, he was also chair of the University of London Working Party on future of medical and dental teaching resources; and between 1983 and 1985, he was chair of the Committee of Vice-Chancellors and Principals.

He was also a member of the council of the Academia Europaea from 1988 to 1991, governor of Middlesex University from 1992 to 2001 and chair of the Committee of Enquiry into the Academic Year in 1992 and 1993. For the Royal Postgraduate Medical School, he was member of the council and vice-chairman from 1990 to 1997. Between 1991 and 1995, Flowers was member of the Management Board of the London School of Hygiene and Tropical Medicine, and between 1994 and 1995, its chairman.

For the Nuffield Foundation he was managing trustee from 1982 to 1998 and chairman from 1987 to 1998. During his chairmanship of the Nuffield Foundation, he played a significant role in the establishment by the Foundation of the Nuffield Council on Bioethics in 1991.

From 1998, he was vice-chairman of the Parliamentary Office of Science and Technology (POST). He was also a Founding Fellow of the Learned Society of Wales.

== Honours and awards ==
- Elected to membership of The Manchester Literary and Philosophical Society 1961
- 1961: Elected a Fellow of the Royal Society
- 1968: Institute of Physics Ernest Rutherford Medal and Prize
- 1969: Knighted
- 1979: Made a life peer with the title Baron Flowers, of Queen's Gate in the City of Westminster on 20 February 1979.
- 1981: Made an Officer of the French Légion d'honneur.
- 1984: Imperial College commissioned his portrait from the painter, Kyffin Williams.
- 1987: Awarded the Glazebrook Medal by the Institute of Physics.

== Personal life ==
From 1951 until his death he was married to Mary Frances Behrens, and had two stepsons, Peter and Michael. Lady Flowers died in January 2016 at the age of 94.

== Selected works ==
- 1970: Properties of Matter. Chichester: Wiley (with Eric Mendoza)
- 1995: An Introduction to Numerical Methods in C++, Oxford: Clarendon Press

== See also ==
- List of Vice-Chancellors of the University of London

== Sources ==
- "DodOnline". Archived from the original on 8 February 2007.

Academic offices
Preceded by Samuel Devons	Langworthy Professor at the University of Manchester; 1961–72	Succeeded by
Preceded by William Penney	Rector of Imperial College London; 1973–85	Succeeded by Eric Ash
Preceded by Lord Quirk	Vice-Chancellor of University of London; 1985–90	Succeeded by Lord Sutherland
