= Irina Grigorieva (academic) =

Russian physicist

- Education: Institute of Solid State Physics (Russia)
- Spouse: Andre Geim
- Awards: Institute of Physics David Tabor Prize (2019)
- Scientific career
- Workplaces: University of Manchester; University of Bristol

Irina Grigorieva, Lady Geim is a Professor of Physics at the University of Manchester and Director of the Engineering and Physical Sciences Research Council Centre for Doctoral Training in Science and the Applications of Graphene. She was awarded the 2019 David Tabor Medal and Prize of the Institute of Physics and was elected as a Fellow of the Institute.

== Early life and education ==
Grigorieva was born in Russia. She studied physics at the Institute of Solid State Physics in Russia and earned her PhD in 1989.

== Research and career ==
In 1990, Grigorieva moved to Nottingham with her husband Andre Geim. She visited the University of Oxford, University of Cambridge and Imperial College London to deliver seminars on her PhD research. Eventually, she joined the University of Bristol as a postdoctoral researcher. She moved to Nijmegen where she worked as a laboratory assistant.

Grigorieva suggested to Geim that he use a frog to demonstrate magnetic levitation, for which Geim won the Ig Nobel Prize.

She joined the University of Manchester in 2001, where she works in the Condensed Matter Physics group. When she joined the group, she started studying the adhesive mechanisms of the feet of gecko lizards. In 2003, she created a gecko-like adhesive that is self-cleaning and re-attachable. Grigorieva is a member of the Graphene Council.

Grigorieva is a Professor of Physics at the University of Manchester and Director of the Engineering and Physical Sciences Research Council Centre for Doctoral Training in Science and the Applications of Graphene. She works on the electronic and magnetic properties of two-dimensional materials. She is interested in superconducting materials and the application of graphene in spintronics. In 2013, she was the first to demonstrate that graphene could be magnetic through the use of non-magnetic atoms and vacancies. Defects in graphene carry Spin-½ magnetic moments.

In 2015, she demonstrated that it is possible to switch the magnetism in graphene on and off. She created small bubbles out of graphene and showed that they can withstand pressures of 200 megapascals, which is greater that in the deep ocean. To measure the pressure inside a graphene bubble, they used atomic force microscopy and a monolayer of boron nitride.

Grigorieva used graphene as a filter to remove subatomic particles, including taking protons from heavy water. This includes removing deuterium for the cleaning of nuclear waste.

=== Awards and honours ===
- 2019 Institute of Physics David Tabor Medal and Prize

=== Personal life ===
Grigorieva and husband, physicist Sir Andre Geim, have a daughter. She serves on the Board of Governors of Withington Girls' School.
