= Antonio H. Castro Neto =

Brazilian-born physicist

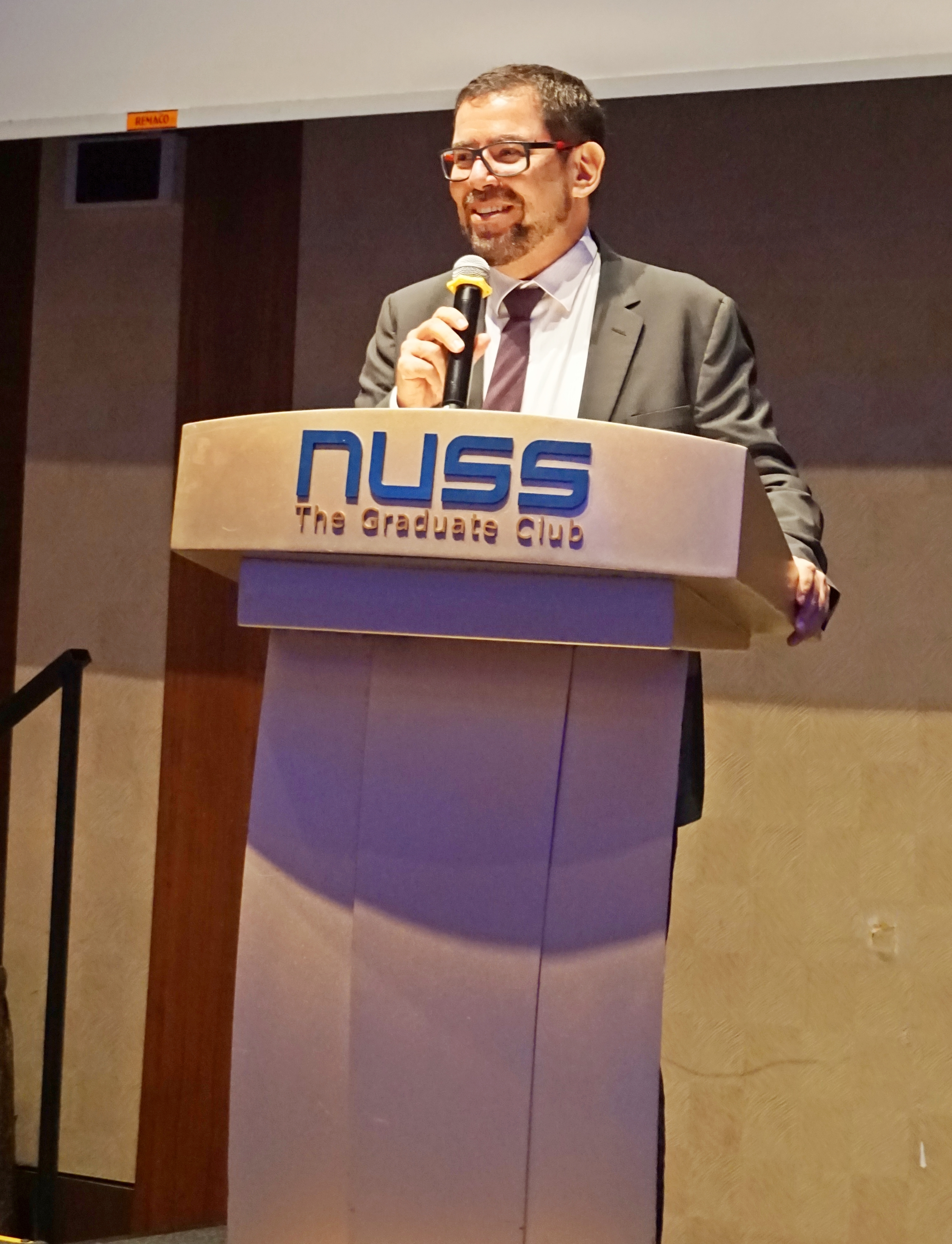
- Castro Neto in January 2020
- Born: 20 August 1964; Paranaguá, Paraná, Brazil
- Education: University of Illinois at Urbana-Champaign
- Awards: Fellow of the American Physical Society (2003); Distinguished Visiting Chair Professor at the SKKU Advanced Institute of Nano-Technology(2012); Fellow of the American Association for the Advancement of Science(2013); Kramers Chair Professorship of Theoretical Physics at Utrecht University (2015)
- Website: https://graphene.nus.edu.sg/team_member/antonio-castro-neto

Antonio Helio de Castro Neto, often referred to as the 'Godfather of Graphene,' is a Brazilian-born physicist who serves as the founder and director of the Centre for Advanced 2D Materials (previously known as the Graphene Research Centre) and as Co-Director of the Institute for Functional Intelligent Materials (IFIM) at the National University of Singapore. He is a condensed matter theorist known for his work in the theory of metals, magnets, superconductors, graphene and two-dimensional materials. He is a distinguished professor in the Departments of Materials Science Engineering, and Physics and a professor at the Department of Electrical and Computer Engineering. He was elected as a fellow of the American Physical Society in 2003. In 2011 he was elected as a fellow of the American Association for the Advancement of Science.

== Education ==
In 1984, Castro Neto attended the State University of Campinas (UNICAMP). In Campinas, he completed his undergraduate and Master of Science degree in physics under Amir O. Caldeira. In 1991, he moved to the United States where he obtained his PhD degree at the University of Illinois at Urbana-Champaign under the supervision of Eduardo Fradkin. His PhD thesis dealt with the understanding and description of the lowest energy excitations of Fermi liquids.

== Career ==
After graduation in 1994, he joined the Institute for Theoretical Physics (currently, Kavli Institute for Theoretical Physics) at the University of California, Santa Barbara. There he studied the electronic properties of nanomaterials and nanostructures under Matthew Fisher. In 1995, he moved to the University of California, Riverside as an assistant professor. In 2000, he moved to Boston University as a professor of physics.

Castro Neto published on theoretical aspects of graphene such as the effect of vacancies in the electronic properties; the electronic properties of bilayer graphene; superconductivity; twistronics; Coulomb blockade in graphene mesoscopic structures; atomic collapse at charge impurities; localized magnetic states; gap opening in biased bilayers; strain engineering; and impurity induced spin-orbit effect. In 2016, Thomson Reuters recognized Castro Neto as among the top 1% of researchers in physics. He was also recognized by Clarivate Analytics from 2017 to 2019. His work has been cited more than 101,602 times, and he has an h-index of 122.

In 2008, he moved to the National University of Singapore, starting the Graphene Research Centre (GRC) in 2010 with facilities for the synthesis, characterization, and device fabrication of graphene devices. In 2014, the GRC was expanded by a grant of the National Research Foundation of Singapore to explore other 2D materials beyond graphene and their heterostructures with the creation of the Centre for Advanced 2D Materials.

Castro Neto has initiated and later closed 3 science spinoffs out of the National University in Singapore: 2D Materials in 2015; MADE Advanced Materials in 2017 and Graphene Watts in 2019.
