= National Graphene Institute =

Research institute in Manchester, England

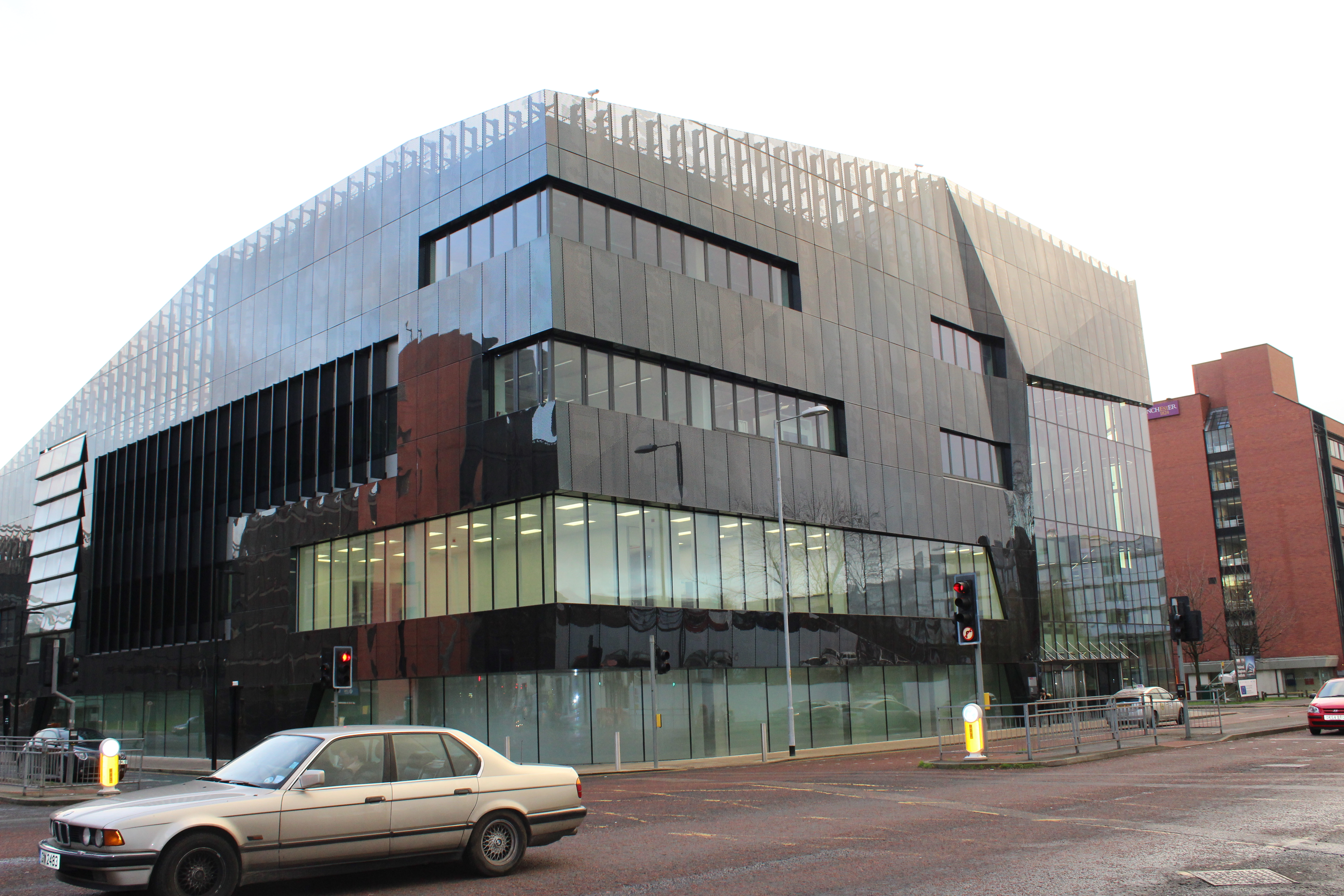

General information
- Type: Research
- Location: Booth Street East, Manchester, England
- Coordinates: 53°28′08″N 2°14′00″W
- Construction started: 2013
- Completed: 2015
- Owner: University of Manchester

Technical details
- Floor count: 5
- Floor area: 7,600 m^{2} (82,000 sq ft)

Design and construction
- Architect: Jestico + Whiles
- Main contractor: BAM Nuttall

Website
- Official website

The National Graphene Institute is a research institute and building at the University of Manchester, England, that is focused on the research of graphene. Construction of the building to house the institute started in 2013 and finished in 2015.

== Institute ==
The creation of the institute, including the construction of the building, cost £61 million. Funded by the UK Government (£38 million) and the European Union's European Regional Development Fund (£23 million), the building is the national centre for graphene research in the UK. It provides facilities for industry and university academics to collaborate on graphene applications and the commercialisation of graphene. The building was opened on 20 March 2015 by the Chancellor of the Exchequer George Osborne.

== Building ==
The five-storey glass-fronted building provides 7,600 m^{2} (82,000 sq ft) of research space. This includes 1,500 m^{2} (16,000 sq ft) of class 100 and class 1000 clean rooms, one of which occupies the entire lower ground floor (in order to minimise vibrations) plus laser, optical, metrology and chemical laboratories, along with offices, a seminar room and accommodation. The top floor also includes a roof terrace, which has 21 different grasses and wildflowers designed to attract urban bees and other species of pollinators. The outside of the building consists of a composite cladding, with an external stainless steel 'veil'. The building faces on to Booth Street East. Construction started in March 2013, with the building being completed in 2015.

The building was designed by Jestico + Whiles in close collaboration with a team of academics led by Prof Sir Konstantin Novoselov. It cost around £30 million, and was constructed by BAM Nuttall. The structural design was produced by Ramboll. Other shortlisted organisations were: Lendlease, Balfour Beatty (M&E Installation)Morgan Sindall, Vinci, and M&W Group. The design work was led by EC Harris, along with CH2M who provided specialist technical architecture design services for the cleanrooms and laboratories, together with Mechanical, Electrical and Process (MEP) consultant services.

=== History of the location ===
The institute was constructed on the former site of the Albert Club, which was a Victorian club that was located between Lawson Street and Clifford Street. The club was established for the middle class German community that were involved in Manchester's cotton trade, and Friedrich Engels frequented it during his time in the city, becoming a member in 1842. The club was located on Clifford Street from 1842 prior to its relocation in 1859. The building was constructed by the architect Jeptha Pacey as his personal house, and it was fronted by formal gardens. It was later converted into a private social club, which was named after Albert, Prince Consort.

In 1859 it was rebuilt by William Potter as one of England's first Victorian Turkish baths, remaining open until 1868 when it was used as an extension to the Manchester Southern Hospital for Women and Children. The building was demolished in the 1960s, and the site was used for the construction of the Lamb Building.

The excavations that took place in February 2013 by Oxford Archaeology North, prior to the construction of the institute, uncovered the remnants of the club building along with a row of five cellars belonging to 1830s terraced housing. A sink removed from the site has been incorporated into the institute's new building.The stone sink was plumbed in with both cold feed supply and waste pipework by A .Armstrong of Balfour Beatty who completed both the mechanical and Electrical installations throughout the new build of NGI As the main clean room of the new building is now located 3 m (9.8 ft) below ground level, the remains of the Albert Club were not conserved.

== Gallery ==
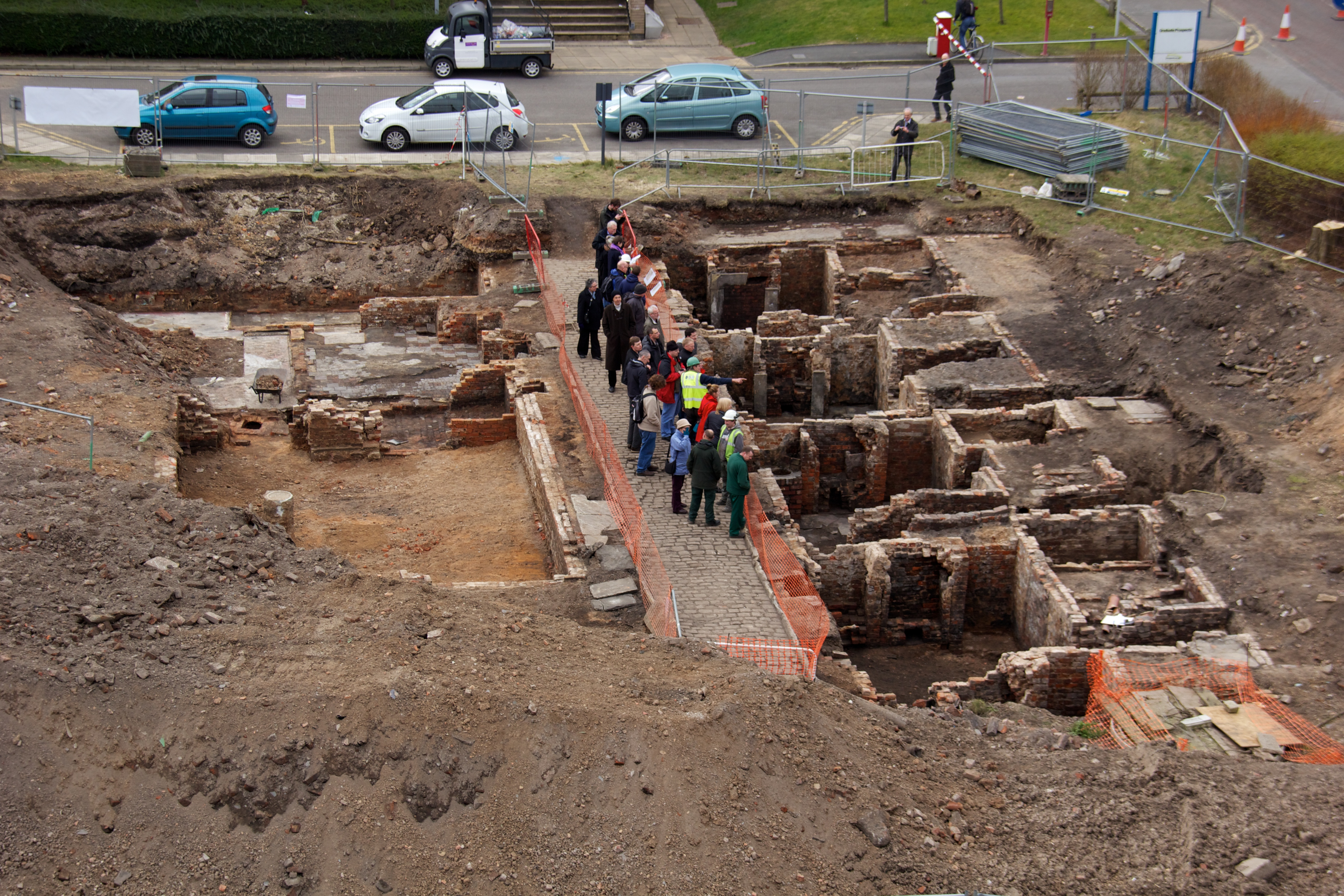
Excavations at the site of the institute.

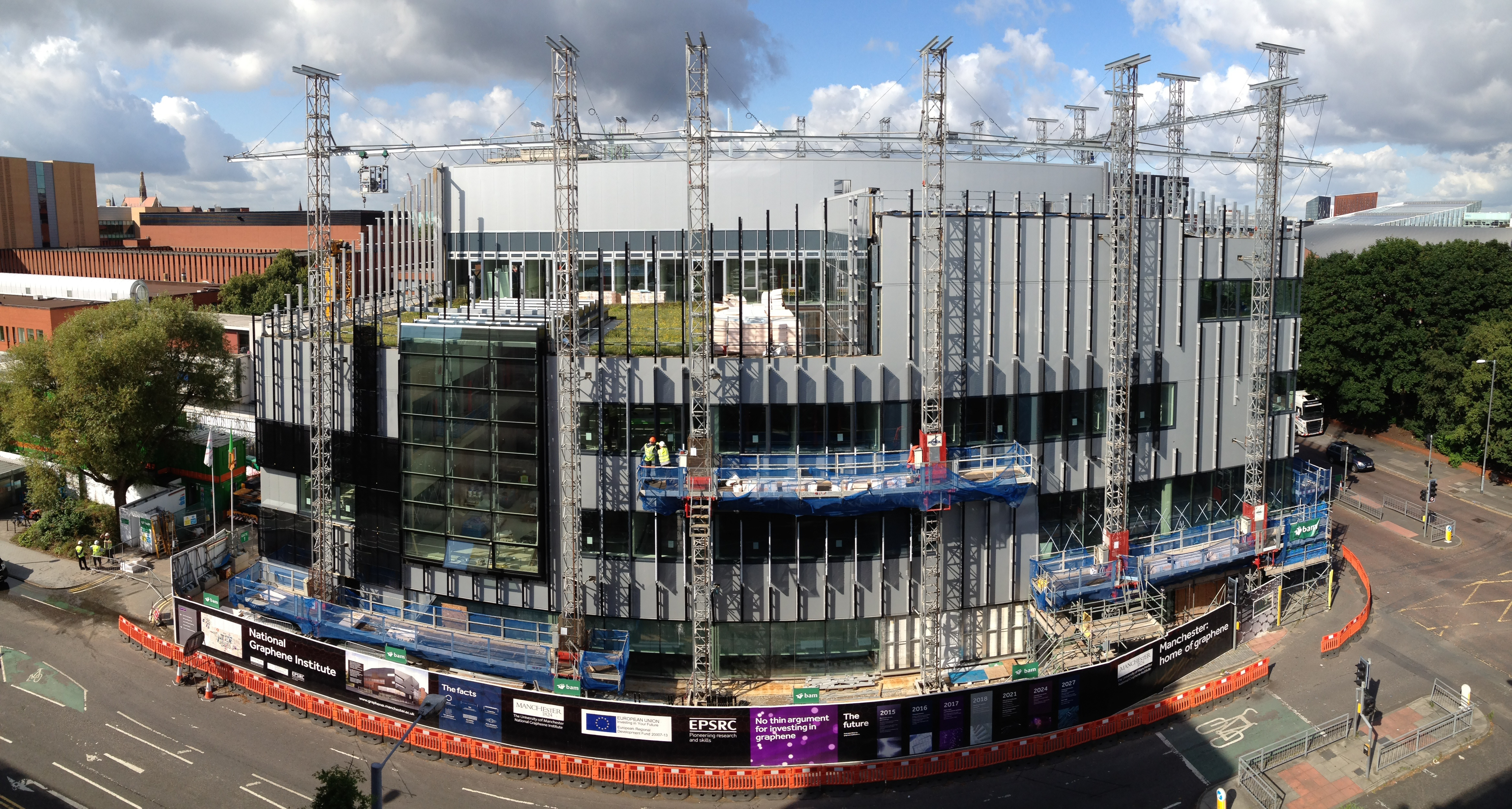
The National Graphene Institute under construction in August 2014.

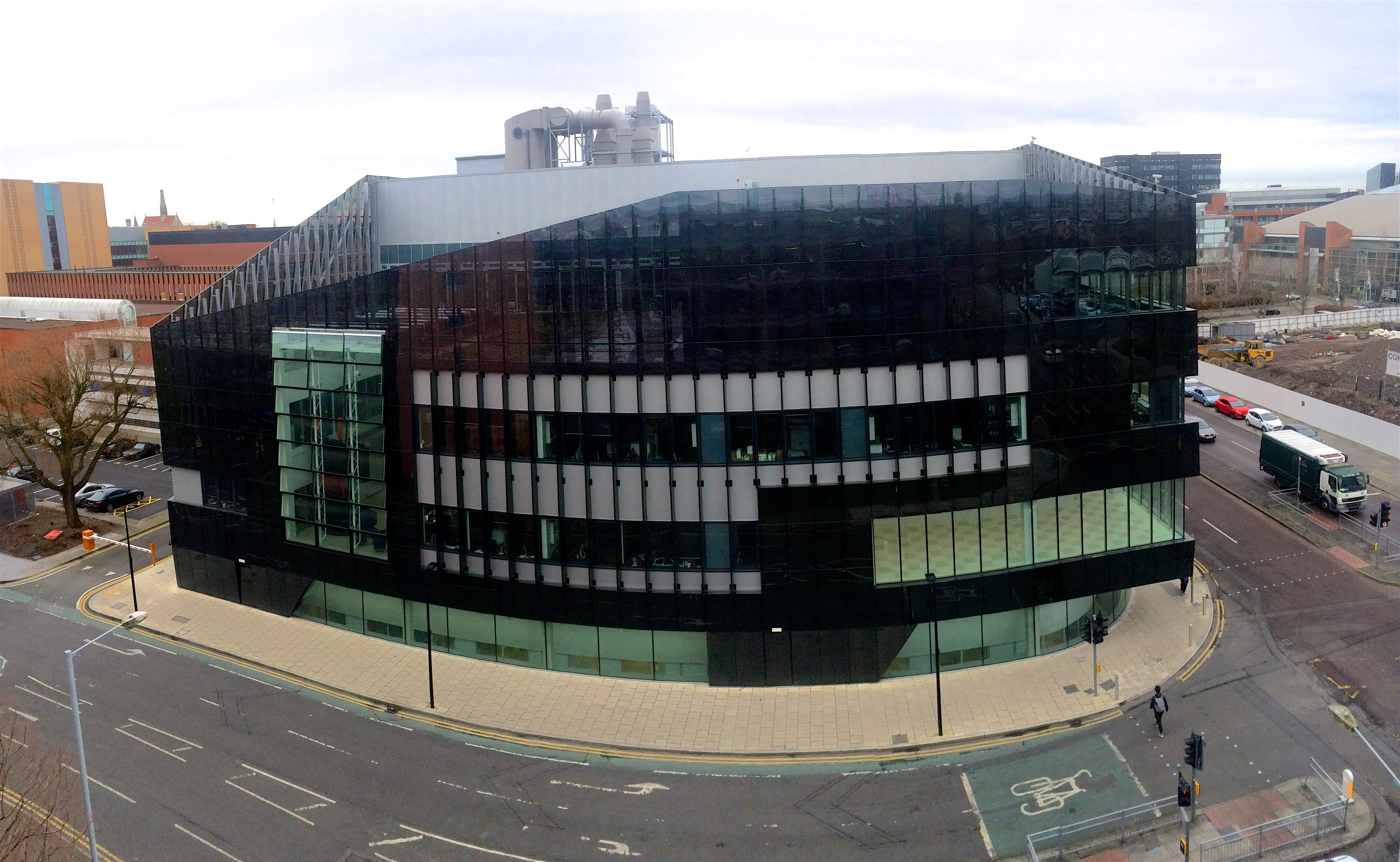
The building in 2016.
