= Fractional vortices =

In a standard superconductor, described by a complex field fermionic condensate wave function (denoted $|\Psi|e^{i\phi}$), vortices carry quantized magnetic fields because the condensate wave function $|\Psi|e^{i\phi}$ is invariant to increments of the phase $\phi$ by $2\pi$. There a winding of the phase ${\phi}$ by $2\pi$ creates a vortex which carries one flux quantum. See quantum vortex.

The term Fractional vortex is used for two kinds of very different quantum vortices which occur when:

(i) A physical system allows phase windings different from $2\pi \times \mathit{integer}$, i.e. non-integer or fractional phase winding. Quantum mechanics prohibits it in a uniform ordinary superconductor, but it becomes possible in an inhomogeneous system, for example, if a vortex is placed on a boundary between two superconductors which are connected only by an extremely weak link (also called a Josephson junction); such a situation also occurs on grain boundaries etc. At such superconducting boundaries the phase can have a discontinuous jump. Correspondingly, a vortex placed onto such a boundary acquires a fractional phase winding hence the term fractional vortex. A similar situation occurs in Spin-1 Bose condensate, where a vortex with $\pi$ phase winding can exist if it is combined with a domain of overturned spins.

(ii) A different situation occurs in uniform multicomponent superconductors, which allow stable vortex solutions with integer phase winding $2\pi N$, where $N= \pm 1, \pm 2, ...$, which however carry arbitrarily fractionally quantized magnetic flux.

Observation of fractional-flux vortices was reported in a multiband Iron-based superconductor.

== (i) Vortices with non-integer phase winding ==
=== Josephson vortices ===
==== Fractional vortices at phase discontinuities ====
Josephson phase discontinuities may appear in specially designed long Josephson junctions (LJJ). For example, so-called 0-π LJJ have a $\pi$ discontinuity of the Josephson phase at the point where 0 and $\pi$ parts join. Physically, such $0-\pi$ LJJ can be fabricated using tailored ferromagnetic barrier or using d-wave superconductors. The Josephson phase discontinuities can also be introduced using artificial tricks, e.g., a pair of tiny current injectors attached to one of the superconducting electrodes of the LJJ. The value of the phase discontinuity is denoted by κ and, without losing generality, it is assumed that 0<κ<2π, because the phase is 2π periodic.

An LJJ reacts to the phase discontinuity by bending the Josephson phase $\phi(x)$ in the $\lambda_J$ vicinity of the discontinuity point, so that far away there are no traces of this perturbation. The bending of the Josephson phase inevitably results in appearance of a local magnetic field $\propto d\phi(x)/dx$ localized around the discontinuity ($0-\pi$ boundary). It also results in the appearance of a supercurrent $\propto\sin\phi(x)$ circulating around the discontinuity. The total magnetic flux Φ, carried by the localized magnetic field is proportional to the value of the discontinuity $\kappa$, namely Φ = (κ/2π)Φ, where Φ_{0} is a magnetic flux quantum. For a π-discontinuity, Φ=Φ_{0}/2, the vortex of the supercurrent is called a semifluxon. When κ≠π, one speaks about arbitrary fractional Josephson vortices. This type of vortex is pinned at the phase discontinuity point, but may have two polarities, positive and negative, distinguished by the direction of the fractional flux and direction of the supercurrent (clockwise or counterclockwise) circulating around its center (discontinuity point).

The semifluxon is a particular case of such a fractional vortex pinned at the phase discontinuity point.

Although, such fractional Josephson vortices are pinned, if perturbed they may perform a small oscillations around the phase discontinuity point with an eigenfrequency, that depends on the value of κ.

==== Splintered vortices (double sine-Gordon solitons) ====
In the context of d-wave superconductivity, a fractional vortex (also known as splintered vortex) is a vortex of supercurrent carrying unquantized magnetic flux Φ_{1}<Φ_{0}, which depends on parameters of the system. Physically, such vortices may appear at the grain boundary between two d-wave superconductors, which often looks like a regular or irregular sequence of 0 and π facets. One can also construct an artificial array of short 0 and π facets to achieve the same effect. These splintered vortices are solitons. They are able to move and preserve their shape similar to conventional integer Josephson vortices (fluxons). This is opposite to the fractional vortices pinned at phase discontinuity, e.g. semifluxons, which are pinned at the discontinuity and cannot move far from it.

Theoretically, one can describe a grain boundary between d-wave superconductors (or an array of tiny 0 and π facets) by an effective equation for a large-scale phase ψ. Large scale means that the scale is much larger than the facet size. This equation is double sin-Gordon equation, which in normalized units reads

$\ddot{\psi}-\psi''+\sin\psi+g\sin(2\psi)=0$	EqDSG

where g<0 is a dimensionless constant resulting from averaging over tiny facets. The detailed mathematical procedure of averaging is similar to the one done for a parametrically driven pendulum, and can be extended to time-dependent phenomena. In essence, (EqDSG) described extended φ Josephson junction.

For g<-1 (EqDSG) has two stable equilibrium values (in each 2π interval): ψ=±φ, where φ=cos(-1/g). They corresponding to two energy minima. Correspondingly, there are two fractional vortices (topological solitons): one with the phase ψ(x) going from -φ to +φ, while the other has the phase ψ(x) changing from +φ to -φ+2π. The first vortex has a topological change of 2φ and carries the magnetic flux Φ_{1}=(φ/π)Φ_{0}. The second vortex has a topological change of 2π-2φ and carries the flux Φ_{2}=Φ_{0}-Φ_{1}.

Splintered vortices were first observed at the asymmetric 45° grain boundaries between two d-wave superconductors YBa_{2}Cu_{3}O_{7−δ}.

=== Spin-triplet Superfluidity ===
In certain states of spin-1 superfluids or Bose condensates, the condensate wavefunction is invariant if the superfluid phase changes by $\pi$, along with a $\pi$ rotation of spin angle. This is in contrast to the $2\pi$ invariance of condensate wavefunction in a spin-0 superfluid. A vortex resulting from such phase windings is called fractional or half-quantum vortex, in contrast to one-quantum vortex where a phase changes by $2\pi$.

== (ii) Vortices with integer phase winding and fractional flux in multicomponent superconductivity ==
Different kinds of "Fractional vortices" appear in a different context in multi-component superconductivity where several independent charged condensates or superconducting components interact with each other electromagnetically. Such a situation occurs for example in the $U(1)\times U(1)$ theories of the projected quantum states of liquid metallic hydrogen, where two order parameters originate from theoretically anticipated coexistence of electronic and protonic Cooper pairs. There topological defects with an $2\pi$ (i.e. "integer") phase winding only in or only in a protonic condensate carries fractionally quantized magnetic flux: a consequence of electromagnetic interaction with the second condensate. Also these fractional vortices carry a superfluid momentum which does not obey Onsager-Feynman quantization Despite the integer phase winding, the basic properties of these kinds of fractional vortices are very different from the Abrikosov vortex solutions. For example, in contrast to the Abrikosov vortex, their magnetic field generically is not exponentially localized in space. Also in some cases the magnetic flux inverts its direction at a certain distance from the vortex center

== See also ==
- Josephson junction
- π Josephson junction
- magnetic flux quantum
- Semifluxon
- Quantum vortex
