= Pi Josephson junction =

Quantum mechanical device

A Josephson junction (JJ) is a quantum mechanical device which is made of two superconducting electrodes separated by a barrier (thin insulating tunnel barrier, normal metal, semiconductor, ferromagnet, etc.). A π Josephson junction is a Josephson junction in which the Josephson phase φ equals π in the ground state, i.e. when no external current or magnetic field is applied.

== Background ==
The supercurrent I_{s} through a Josephson junction is generally given by I_{s} = I_{c}sin(φ), where φ is the phase difference of the superconducting wave functions of the two electrodes, i.e. the Josephson phase. The critical current I_{c} is the maximum supercurrent that can exist through the Josephson junction. In experiment, one usually causes some current through the Josephson junction and the junction reacts by changing the Josephson phase. From the above formula it is clear that the phase φ = arcsin(I/I_{c}), where I is the applied (super)current.

Since the phase is 2π-periodic, i.e. φ and φ + 2πn are physically equivalent, without losing generality, the discussion below refers to the interval 0 ≤ φ < 2π.

When no current (I = 0) exists through the Josephson junction, e.g. when the junction is disconnected, the junction is in the ground state and the Josephson phase across it is zero (φ = 0). The phase can also be φ = π, also resulting in no current through the junction. It turns out that the state with φ = π is unstable and corresponds to the Josephson energy maximum, while the state φ = 0 corresponds to the Josephson energy minimum and is a ground state.

In certain cases, one may obtain a Josephson junction where the critical current is negative (I_{c} < 0). In this case, the first Josephson relation becomes

$$I_s = -|I_c|\sin(\varphi) = |I_c|\sin(\varphi+\pi)$$

The ground state of such a Josephson junction is $\phi=\pi$ and corresponds to the Josephson energy minimum, while the conventional state φ = 0 is unstable and corresponds to the Josephson energy maximum. Such a Josephson junction with $\phi=\pi$ in the ground state is called a π Josephson junction.

π Josephson junctions have quite unusual properties. For example, if one connects (shorts) the superconducting electrodes with the inductance L (e.g. superconducting wire), one may expect the spontaneous supercurrent circulating in the loop, passing through the junction and through inductance clockwise or counterclockwise. This supercurrent is spontaneous and belongs to the ground state of the system. The direction of its circulation is chosen at random. This supercurrent will of course induce a magnetic field which can be detected experimentally. The magnetic flux passing through the loop will have the value from 0 to a half of magnetic flux quanta, i.e. from 0 to Φ_{0}/2, depending on the value of inductance L.

== Technologies and physical principles ==
- Ferromagnetic Josephson junctions. Consider a Josephson junction with a ferromagnetic Josephson barrier, i.e. the multilayers superconductor-ferromagnet-superconductor (SFS) or superconductor-insulator-ferromagnet-superconductor (SIFS). In such structures the superconducting order parameter inside the F-layer oscillates in the direction perpendicular to the junction plane. As a result, for certain thicknesses of the F-layer and temperatures, the order parameter may become +1 at one superconducting electrode and −1 at the other superconducting electrode. In this situation one gets a π Josephson junction. Note that inside the F-layer the competition of different solutions takes place and the one with the lower energy wins out. Various ferromagnetic $\pi$ junctions have been fabricated: SFS junctions with weak ferromagnetic interlayers; SFS junctions with strong ferromagnetic interlayers, such as Co, Ni, PdFe and NiFe SIFS junctions; and S-Fi-S junctions.
- Josephson junctions with unconventional order parameter symmetry. Novel superconductors, notably high temperature cuprate superconductors, have an anisotropic superconducting order parameter which can change its sign depending on the direction. In particular, a so-called d-wave order parameter has a value of +1 if one looks along the crystal axis a and −1 if one looks along the crystal axis b. If one looks along the ab direction (45° between a and b) the order parameter vanishes. By making Josephson junctions between d-wave superconducting films with different orientations or between d-wave and conventional isotropic s-wave superconductors, one can get a phase shift of $\pi$. Nowadays there are several realizations of π Josephson junctions of this type:
  - tri-crystal grain boundary Josephson junctions,
  - tetra-crystal grain boundary Josephson junctions,
  - d-wave/s-wave ramp zigzag Josephson junctions,
  - tilt-twist grain boundary Josephson junctions,
  - p-wave based Josephson junctions.
- Superconductor–normal metal–superconductor (SNS) Josephson junctions with non-equilibrium electron distribution in N-layer.
- Superconductor–quantum dot–superconductor (S-QuDot-S) Josephson junctions (implemented by carbon nanotube Josephson junctions).

== Historical developments ==
Theoretically, the first time the possibility of creating a $\pi$ Josephson junction was discussed by Bulaevskii et al. , who considered a Josephson junction with paramagnetic scattering in the barrier. Almost one decade later, the possibility of having a $\pi$ Josephson junction was discussed in the context of heavy fermion p-wave superconductors. Experimentally, the first $\pi$ Josephson junction was a corner junction made of yttrium barium copper oxide (d-wave) and Pb (s-wave) superconductors. The first unambiguous proof of a $\pi$ Josephson junction with a ferromagnetic barrier was given only a decade later. That work used a weak ferromagnet consisting of a copper-nickel alloy (Cu_{x}Ni_{1−x}, with x around 0.5) and optimized it so that the Curie temperature was close to the superconducting transition temperature of the superconducting niobium leads.

== See also ==
- Josephson effect
- φ Josephson junction
- Semifluxon
- Fractional vortices
- Brian D. Josephson
