= Time-dependent Ginzburg–Landau theory =

Equations in quantum field theory

The time-dependent Ginzburg-Landau (TDGL) equations give the evolution in time of the steady-state equations of the Ginzburg-Landau theory (GL). Although phenomenological, these equations can be very useful in making qualitative predictions about the time evolution of superconductors, particularly in the mixed state where Abrikosov vortices or Pearl vortices may appear.

Because of the phenomenological nature of GL theory, there are a number of different ways to expand its time dependence including different corrections and approximations. For example, in their seminal paper using TDGL to describe the time scale of fluctuations in one-dimensional superconducting wires, McCumber and Halperin adopt the following form (note units are CGS):

$$\tau(T) \left(\frac{\partial}{\partial t} + i \frac{2eV}{\hbar}\right) \psi = \left(1 - |\psi|^2\right)\psi + \xi(T)\left(\frac{\partial}{\partial x} - i \frac{2e}{\hbar c} A_x\right)^2\psi$$

With $\psi$ the order parameter describing the degree of superconducting order; $\tau$ the temperature-dependent GL relaxation time of the order parameter; $V$ the electrochemical potential; $A_x$ the magnetic vector potential; and $\xi$ the superconducting coherence length. However, other forms exist. Sometimes the electrochemical potential is dropped for convenience, even though it increases the quantitative accuracy of the TDGL equations, and sometimes other correction terms are added.

The conditions for the validity of the theory are much more stringent than those of the static GL theory. As in the static case, the system must be close to the critical temperature. In addition, deviations from equilibrium must remain small and this requirement is typically only satisfied in gapless superconductors, where magnetic impurities suppress the gap in the quasiparticle spectrum.
