= Brian Josephson =

British physicist (born 1940)

Brian Josephson FRS
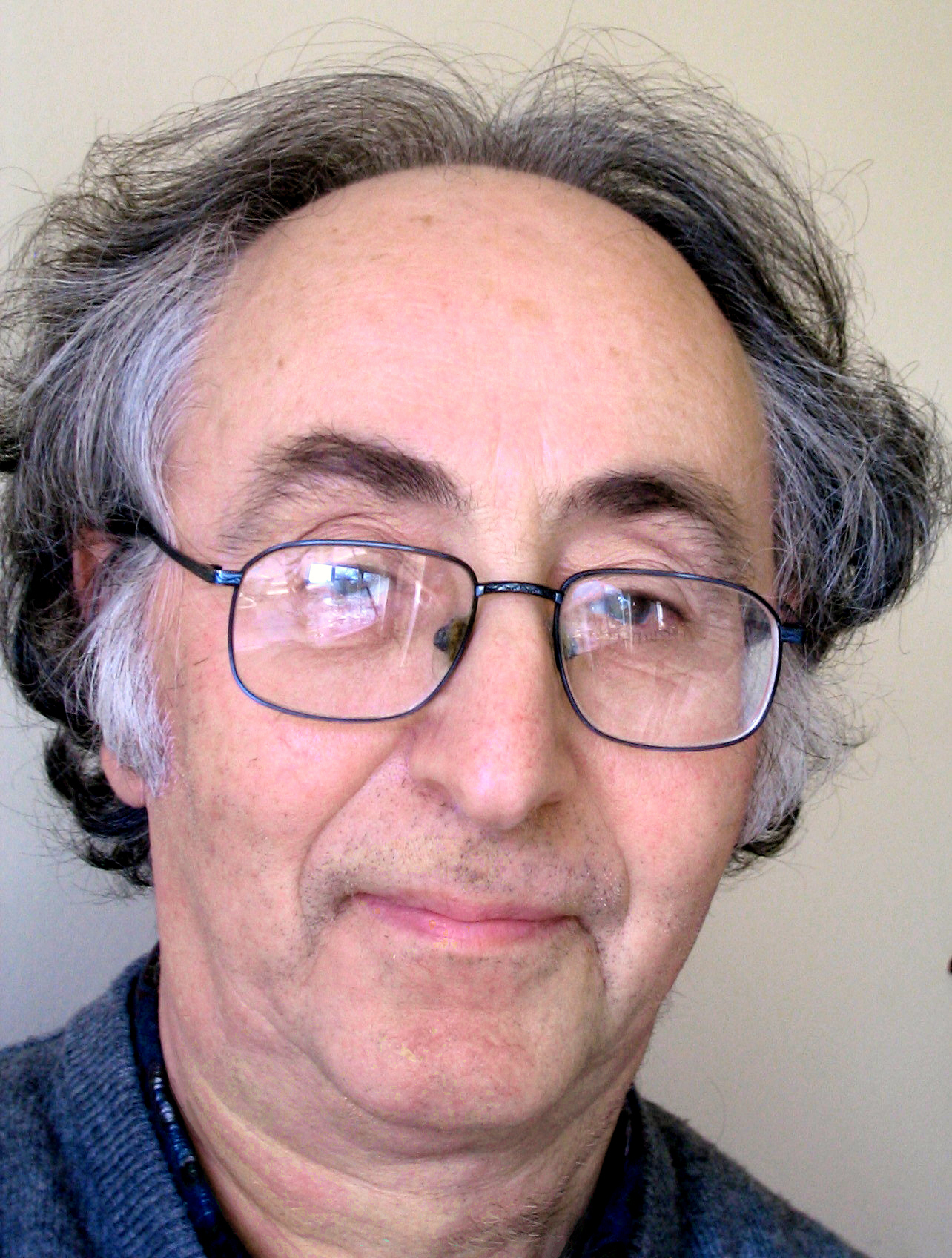
- Josephson in 2004
- Born: Brian David Josephson; 4 January 1940 (age 86); Cardiff, Wales
- Education: University of Cambridge: MA (Cantab); PhD, Physics
- Known for: Josephson effect
- Spouse: Carol Olivier (m. 1976; died 2025)
- Children: 1
- Awards: Fritz London Memorial Prize (1970); Elliott Cresson Medal (1972); Hughes Medal (1972); Nobel Prize in Physics (1973); Fernand Holweck Medal and Prize (1973); Faraday Medal (1982)
- Scientific career
- Fields: Physics
- Workplaces: University of Cambridge
- Thesis: Non-linear conduction in superconductors (1964)
- Doctoral advisor: Brian Pippard

Brian David Josephson (born 4 January 1940) is a British theoretical physicist and emeritus professor at the University of Cambridge. He won the 1973 Nobel Prize in Physics "for his theoretical predictions of the properties of a supercurrent through a tunnel barrier, in particular those phenomena which are generally known as the Josephson effects." (Note: The 1973 Nobel Prize was also awarded jointly to Leo Esaki and Ivar Giaever "for their experimental discoveries regarding tunneling phenomena in semiconductors and superconductors, respectively")

Josephson has spent his academic career as a member of the Theory of Condensed Matter Group in Cambridge's Cavendish Laboratory. He has been a Fellow of Trinity College, Cambridge, since 1962, and served as Professor of Physics from 1974 to 2007.

In the early 1970s, Josephson took up Transcendental Meditation and turned his attention to issues outside the boundaries of mainstream science. He set up the Mind–Matter Unification Project at the Cavendish to explore the idea of intelligence in nature, the relationship between quantum mechanics and consciousness and the synthesis of science and Eastern mysticism, broadly known as quantum mysticism. He has expressed support for topics such as parapsychology, water memory and cold fusion, which has made him a focus of criticism from fellow scientists.

== Education ==
Brian David Josephson was born on 4 January 1940 in Cardiff, Wales, to Jewish parents, Mimi (née Weisbard) and Abraham Josephson. He attended Cardiff High School, where he credits some of the school masters for having helped him, particularly the physics master, Emrys Jones, who introduced him to theoretical physics. In 1957, he went up to Cambridge, where he initially read mathematics at Trinity College, Cambridge. After completing Maths Part II in two years, and finding it somewhat sterile, he decided to switch to physics.

Josephson was known at Cambridge as a brilliant but shy student. Physicist John Waldram recalled overhearing Nicholas Kurti, an examiner from Oxford, discuss Josephson's exam results with David Shoenberg, Reader in Physics at Cambridge, and asking: "Who is this chap Josephson? He seems to be going through the theory like a knife through butter." While still an undergraduate, he published a paper on the Mössbauer effect, pointing out a crucial issue other researchers had overlooked. According to one eminent physicist speaking to Physics World, he wrote several papers important enough to assure him a place in the history of physics even without his discovery of the Josephson effect.

After graduating with a Bachelor of Arts in 1960, Josephson became a research student in Cambridge's Cavendish Laboratory, where he was supervised by Brian Pippard. American physicist Philip W. Anderson (also a future Nobel laureate) spent a year in Cambridge in 1961–1962, and recalled that having Josephson in a class was "a disconcerting experience for a lecturer, I can assure you, because everything had to be right or he would come up and explain it to me after class." It was during this period, in 1962, that he carried out the research that led to his discovery of the Josephson effect; the Cavendish Laboratory unveiled a plaque on the Mond Building dedicated to the discovery in November 2012. He was elected a Fellow of Trinity College in 1962, and received a Doctor of Philosophy in 1964 for a thesis titled Non-linear conduction in superconductors.

== Career ==
Josephson spent a postdoctoral year in the United States (1965–1966) as Research Assistant Professor at the University of Illinois. After returning to Cambridge, he was made Assistant Director of Research in the Cavendish Laboratory in 1967, where he remained a member of the Theory of Condensed Matter Group for the rest of his career. He was elected a Fellow of the Royal Society (FRS) in 1970, and was awarded a National Science Foundation Fellowship by Cornell University the same year. In 1972, he became Reader in Physics, and in 1974 was appointed Professor of Physics, a position he held until his retirement in 2007.

A practitioner of Transcendental Meditation (TM) since the early 1970s, Josephson became a visiting faculty member in 1975 of the Maharishi European Research University in the Netherlands, part of the TM movement. He also held visiting professorships at Wayne State University in 1983, the Indian Institute of Science, Bangalore in 1984, and the University of Missouri-Rolla in 1987.

== Josephson effect ==
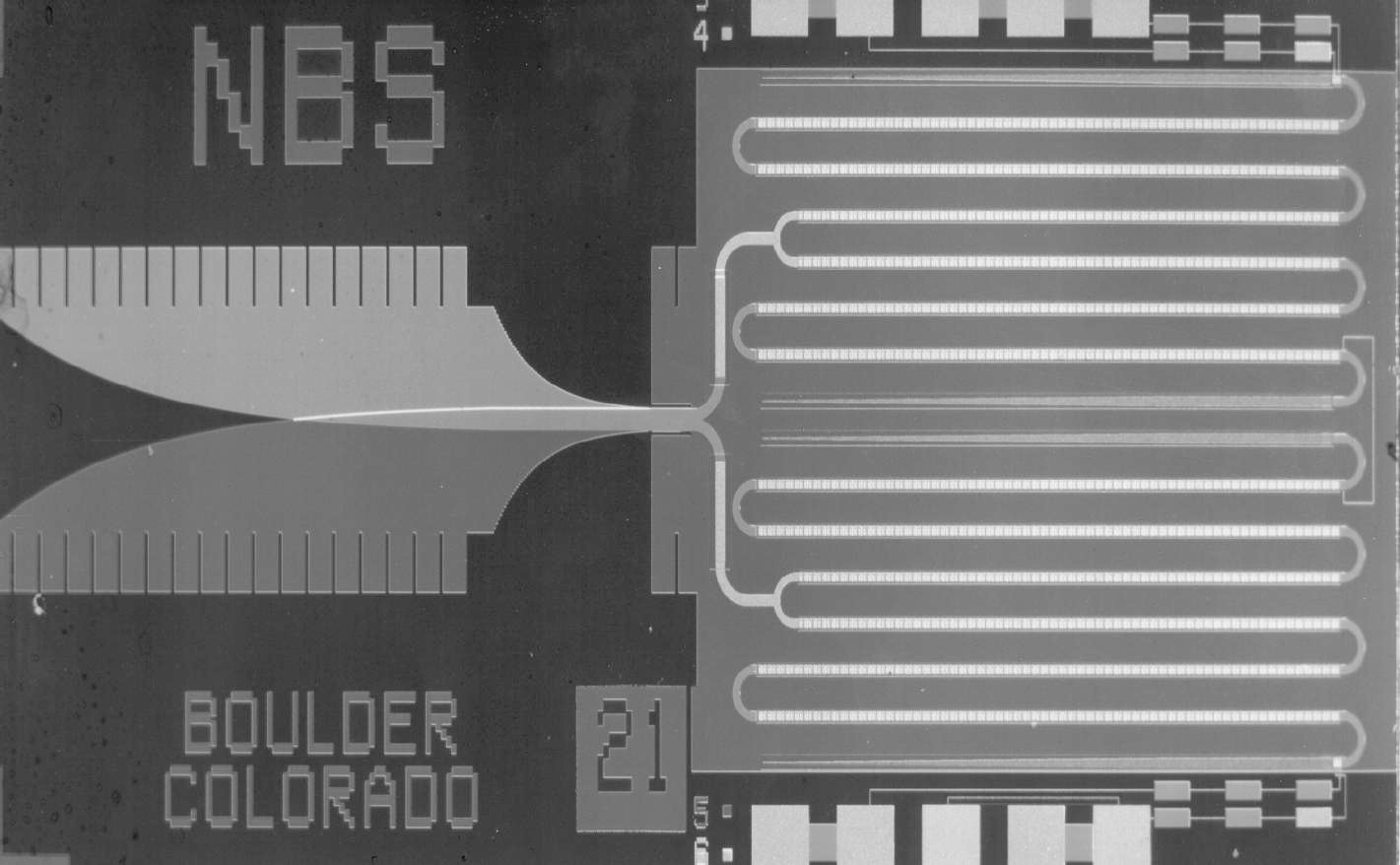
One-volt NIST Josephson junction array standard with 3020 superconducting junctions.

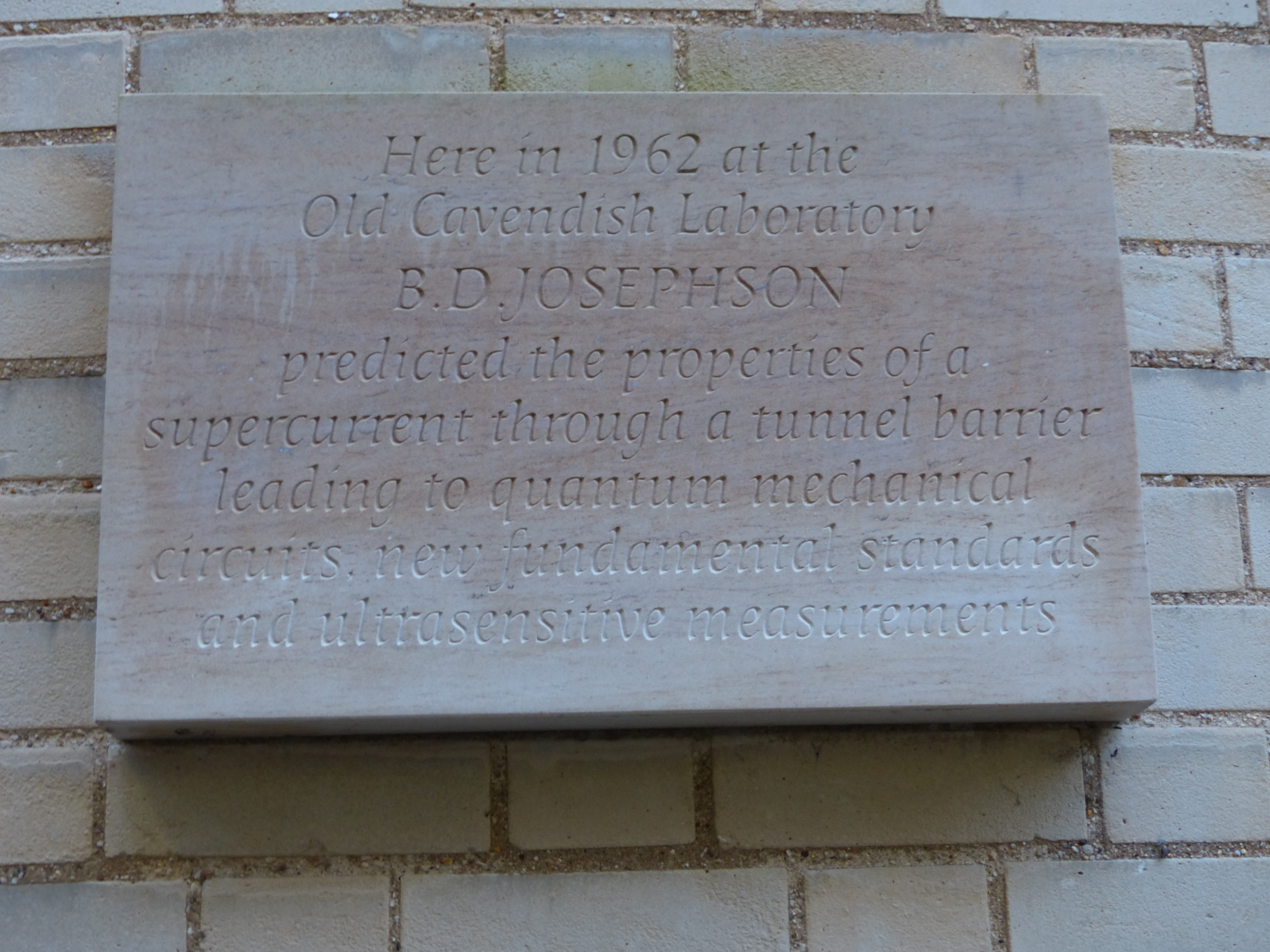
The Cavendish Laboratory unveiled a plaque on the Mond Building in November 2012 for the 50th anniversary of the discovery of the Josephson effect.

Josephson was 22-years-old when he did the work on quantum tunnelling that earned him the 1973 Nobel Prize in Physics. He discovered that a supercurrent could tunnel through a thin barrier, predicting, according to physicist Andrew Whitaker, that "at a junction of two superconductors, a current will flow even if there is no drop in voltage; that when there is a voltage drop, the current should oscillate at a frequency related to the drop in voltage; and that there is a dependence on any magnetic field." This became known as the Josephson effect and the junction as a Josephson junction.

Josephson's calculations were published in Physics Letters (chosen by Pippard because it was a new journal) in a paper titled "Possible new effects in superconductive tunnelling," received on 8 June 1962 and published on 1 July. They were confirmed experimentally by Philip Anderson and John Rowell of Bell Labs in Princeton; this appeared in their paper, "Probable Observation of the Josephson Superconducting Tunneling Effect," submitted to Physical Review Letters in January 1963.

Before Anderson and Rowell confirmed the calculations, the American physicist John Bardeen, who had shared the 1956 Nobel Prize in Physics (and who shared the Prize in 1972), objected to Josephson's work. He submitted an article to Physical Review Letters on 25 July 1962, arguing that "there can be no such superfluid flow." The disagreement led to a confrontation in September that year at Queen Mary College, London, at the Eighth International Conference on Low Temperature Physics. When Bardeen (then one of the most eminent physicists in the world) began speaking, Josephson (still a student) stood up and interrupted him. The men exchanged views, reportedly in a civil and soft-spoken manner. See also: John Bardeen § Josephson effect controversy.

Whitaker writes that the discovery of the Josephson effect led to "much important physics," including the invention of SQUIDs (superconducting quantum interference devices), which are used in geology to make highly sensitive measurements, as well as in medicine and computing. IBM used Josephson's work in 1980 to build a prototype of a computer that would be up to 100 times faster than the IBM 3033 mainframe.

Josephson was awarded several important prizes for his discovery, including the 1969 Research Corporation Award for outstanding contributions to science, and the Hughes Medal and Holweck Prize in 1972. In 1973, he won the Nobel Prize in Physics, sharing the $122,000 award with Leo Esaki and Ivar Giaever who had also worked on quantum tunnelling. Josephson was awarded half the prize "for his theoretical predictions of the properties of a supercurrent through a tunnel barrier, in particular those phenomena which are generally known as the Josephson effects". The other half of the award was shared equally by Japanese physicist Leo Esaki of IBM in Yorktown, New York, and Norwegian–American physicist Ivar Giaever of General Electric in Schenectady, New York.

== Parapsychology ==
=== Early interest and Transcendental Meditation ===
Josephson became interested in philosophy of mind in the late 1960s, (in particular, the mind–body problem), and is one of the few scientists to argue that parapsychological phenomena (telepathy, psychokinesis and other themes) may be real. In 1971, he began practising Transcendental Meditation (TM).

Winning the Nobel Prize in 1973 gave Josephson the freedom to work in less orthodox areas, and he became increasingly involved—including during science conferences, to the irritation of fellow scientists—in talking about meditation, telepathy and higher states of consciousness. In 1974, he angered scientists during a colloquium of molecular and cellular biologists in Versailles by inviting them to read the Bhagavad Gita (5th – 2nd century BCE) and the work of Maharishi Mahesh Yogi, the founder of the TM movement, and by arguing about special states of consciousness achieved through meditation. "Nothing forces us," one scientist shouted at him, "to listen to your wild speculations." Biophysicist Henri Atlan wrote that the session ended in uproar.

In May that year, Josephson addressed a symposium held to welcome the Maharishi to Cambridge. The following month, at the first Canadian conference on psychokinesis, he was one of 21 scientists who tested claims by Matthew Manning, a Cambridgeshire teenager who said he had psychokinetic abilities; Josephson apparently told a reporter that he believed Manning's powers were a new kind of energy. He later withdrew or corrected the statement.

Josephson said that Trinity College's tradition of interest in the paranormal meant that he did not dismiss these ideas out of hand. Several presidents of the Society for Psychical Research had been fellows of Trinity, and the Perrott-Warrick Fund, set up in Trinity in 1937 to fund parapsychology research, is still administered by the college. He continued to explore the idea that there is intelligence in nature, particularly after reading Fritjof Capra's The Tao of Physics (1975), and in 1979 took up a more advanced form of TM, known as the TM-Sidhi program. According to Anderson, the TM movement produced a poster showing Josephson levitating several inches above the floor. Josephson argued that meditation could lead to mystical and scientific insights, and that, as a result of it, he had come to believe in a creator.

=== Fundamental Fysiks Group ===
External image
- Fundamental Fysiks Group in 1975. Left to right: Jack Sarfatti, Saul-Paul Sirag, Nick Herbert and Fred Alan Wolf (seated)

Josephson became involved in the mid-1970s with a group of physicists associated with the Lawrence Berkeley Laboratory at the University of California, Berkeley, who were investigating paranormal claims. They had organized themselves loosely into the Fundamental Fysiks Group, and had effectively become the Stanford Research Institute's (SRI) "house theorists," according to historian of science David Kaiser. Core members in the group were Elizabeth Rauscher, George Weissmann, John Clauser, Jack Sarfatti, Saul-Paul Sirag, Nick Herbert, Fred Alan Wolf, Fritjof Capra, Henry Stapp, Philippe Eberhard and Gary Zukav.

There was significant government interest at the time in quantum mechanics – the American government was financing research at SRI into telepathy – and physicists able to understand it found themselves in demand. The Fundamental Fysiks Group used ideas from quantum physics, particularly Bell's theorem and quantum entanglement, to explore issues such as action at a distance, clairvoyance, precognition, remote viewing and psychokinesis.

In 1976, Josephson travelled to California at the invitation of one of the Fundamental Fysiks Group members, Jack Sarfatti, who introduced him to others including physicist Russell Targ, electrical engineer and parapsychologist Harold E. Puthoff and quantum physicist Henry Stapp. The San Francisco Chronicle covered Josephson's visit.

Josephson co-organised a symposium on consciousness at Cambridge in 1978, publishing the proceedings as Consciousness and the Physical World (1980), with neuroscientist V. S. Ramachandran. A conference on "Science and Consciousness" followed a year later in Cordoba, Spain, attended by physicists and Jungian psychoanalysts, and addressed by Josephson, Fritjof Capra and David Bohm (1917–1992).

By 1996, Josephson had set up the Mind–Matter Unification Project at the Cavendish Laboratory to explore intelligent processes in nature. Josephson says of paranormal phenomena, "There's really strong pressure not to allow these things to be talked about in a positive way." He says of the cause of such phenomena, "'It would have to be something we haven't identified in physical experiments. I think if we can get some sort of model, then people may start to look at it." In 2002, he told Physics World: "Future science will consider quantum mechanics as the phenomenology of particular kinds of organised complex system. Quantum entanglement would be one manifestation of such organisation, paranormal phenomena another."

=== Reception and views on the scientific community ===
Josephson delivered the Pollock Memorial Lecture in 2006, the Hermann Staudinger Lecture in 2009 and the Sir Nevill Mott Lecture in 2010.

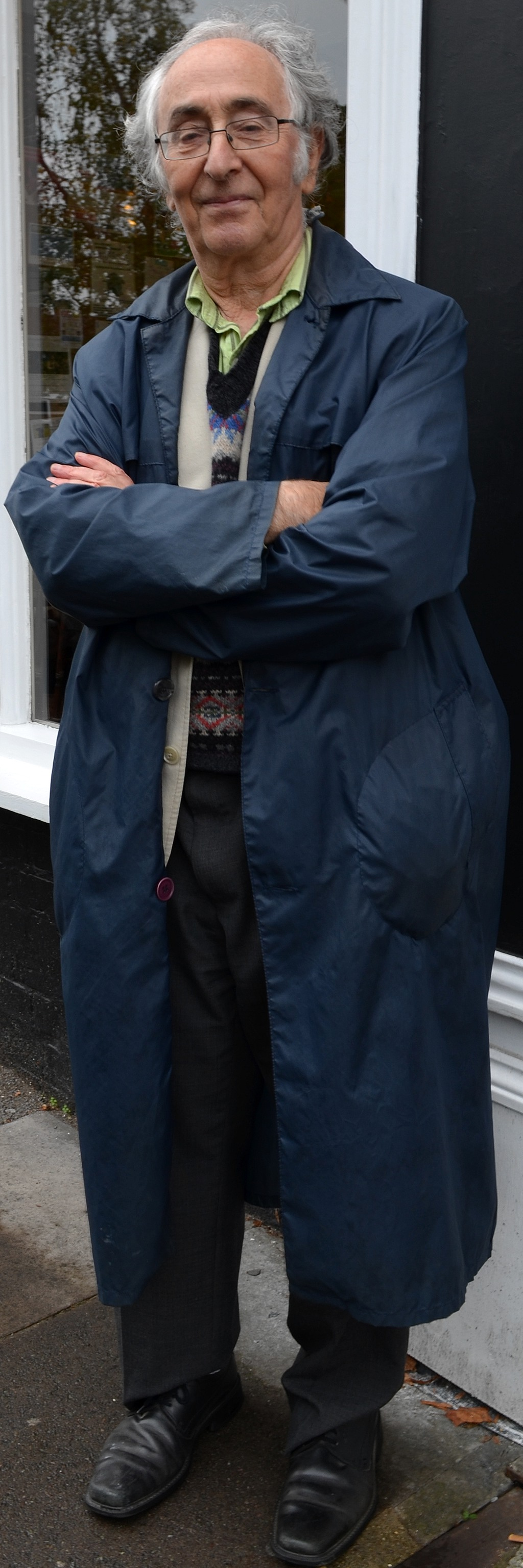
Josephson on a Cambridge Wikimedia walk, 2014.

Matthew Reisz wrote in Times Higher Education in 2010 that Josephson has long been one of physics' "more colourful figures." His support for unorthodox causes has attracted criticism from fellow scientists since the 1970s, including from Philip Anderson. Josephson regards the criticism as prejudice, and believes that it has served to deprive him of an academic support network.

Josephson has repeatedly criticised "science by consensus," arguing that the scientific community is too quick to reject certain kinds of ideas. "Anything goes among the physics community – cosmic wormholes, time travel," he argues, "just so long as it keeps its distance from anything mystical or New Age-ish." Referring to this position as "pathological disbelief," he holds it responsible for the rejection by academic journals of papers on the paranormal. He has compared parapsychology to the theory of continental drift, proposed in 1912 by Alfred Wegener (1880–1930) to explain observations that were otherwise inexplicable, which was resisted and ridiculed until evidence led to its acceptance after Wegener's death.

Science writer Martin Gardner criticised Josephson in 1980 for complaining to The New York Review of Books, along with three other physicists, about an article by J. A. Wheeler that ridiculed parapsychology. Several physicists complained in 2001 when, in a Royal Mail booklet celebrating the Nobel Prize's centenary, Josephson wrote that Britain was at the forefront of research into telepathy. Physicist David Deutsch said the Royal Mail had "let itself be hoodwinked" into supporting nonsense, although another physicist, Robert Matthews, suggested that Deutsch was skating on thin ice given the latter's own work on parallel universes and time travel.

In 2004, Josephson criticised an experiment by the Committee for Skeptical Inquiry to test claims by Russian schoolgirl Natasha Demkina that she could see inside people's bodies using a special kind of vision. The experiment involved her being asked to match six people to their confirmed medical conditions (plus one with none); to pass the test she had to make five correct matches, but made only four. Josephson argued that this was statistically significant, and that the experiment had set her up to fail. One of the researchers, Richard Wiseman, professor of psychology at the University of Hertfordshire, responded by highlighting that the conditions of the experiment had been agreed to before it started, and the potential significance of her claims warranted a higher than normal bar. Keith Rennolis, professor of applied statistics at the University of Greenwich, supported Josephson's position, asserting that the experiment was "woefully inadequate" to determine any effect.

Josephson's reputation for promoting unorthodox causes was cemented by his support for the ideas of water memory and cold fusion, both of which are rejected by mainstream scientists. Water memory is purported to provide a possible explanation for homeopathy; it is dismissed by a majority of scientists as pseudoscience, although he has expressed support for it since attending a conference at which French immunologist Jacques Benveniste first proposed it. Cold fusion is the hypothesis that nuclear reactions can occur at room temperature. When Martin Fleischmann, the British chemist who pioneered research into it, died in 2012, Josephson wrote a supportive obituary in the Guardian, and had published in Nature a letter complaining that its obituary had failed to give Fleischmann due credit. Antony Valentini of Imperial College London withdrew Josephson's invitation to a 2010 conference on the de Broglie–Bohm theory because of his work on the paranormal, although it was reinstated after complaints.

Josephson's defense of paranormal claims and of cold fusion have led him to being described as an exemplar of a sufferer of the hypothetical Nobel disease.

== Recognition ==
=== Memberships ===
Year	Organisation	Type	Ref.
1970	Royal Society	Fellow	
1974	American Academy of Arts and Sciences	International Honorary Member	

=== Awards ===
Year	Organisation	Award	Co-recipients	Citation	Ref.
1970	Duke University	Fritz London Memorial Prize	—	"For predicting effects that have provided concrete examples of macroscopic quantum phenomena, whose importance was stressed by Fritz London. In addition the effects have led to the development of a variety of experimental tools in increased range, sensitivity and precision, applicable to many areas of research."	
1972	Franklin Institute	Elliott Cresson Medal	—	"For the Josephson effect and theory of matter at low temperatures."	
1972	Royal Society	Hughes Medal	—	"Particularly for his discovery of the remarkable properties of junctions between superconducting materials."	
1973	Royal Swedish Academy of Sciences	Nobel Prize in Physics	Leo Esaki and Ivar Giaever	"For his theoretical predictions of the properties of a supercurrent through a tunnel barrier, in particular those phenomena which are generally known as the Josephson effects."	
1973	Institute of Physics; Société Française de Physique	Fernand Holweck Medal and Prize	—	—	
1982	Institution of Electrical Engineers	Faraday Medal	—	—	

=== Honorary degrees ===
Year	University	Degree	Ref.
1983	University of Exeter	Doctor of Science	

== Selected works ==
- (2012). "Biological Observer-Participation and Wheeler's 'Law without Law'," in Plamen L. Simeonov, Leslie S. Smith and Andrée C. Ehresmann (eds.), Integral Biomathics, Springer, pp. 244–252.
- (2005). "Foreword," in Michael A. Thalbourne and Lance Storm (eds.), Parapsychology in the Twenty-First Century, McFarland, pp. 1–2.
- (2003). "We Think That We Think Clearly, But That's Only Because We Don't Think Clearly," in Patrick Colm Hogan and Lalita Pandit (eds.), Rabindranath Tagore: Universality and Tradition, Fairleigh Dickinson University Press, pp. 107–115.
- (2003). "String Theory, Universal Mind, and the Paranormal", arXiv, physics.gen-ph, 2 December 2003.
- (2002). "'Beyond quantum theory: A realist psycho-biological interpretation of reality' revisited", Biosystems, 64(1–3), January, pp. 43–45.
- (2000). "Positive bias to paranormal claims", Physics World, October.
- (1999). "What is truth?, Physics World, February.
- (1997). "Skeptics cornered", Physics World, September.
- (1997). "What is Music a Language For?" in Paavo Pylkkänen, Pauli Pylkkö, and Antti Hautamäki (eds.), Brain, Mind and Physics, IOS Press, pp. 262–265.
- (1996). "Consciously avoiding the X-factor", Physics World, December.
- with Jessica Utts (1996). "Do you believe in psychic phenomena? Are they likely to be able to explain consciousness?", Times Higher Education, 8 April.
- with Tethys Carpenter (1996). "What can Music tell us about the Nature of the Mind? A Platonic Model," in Stuart R. Hameroff, Alfred W. Kaszniak and Alwyn Scott (eds.), Toward a Science of Consciousness, MIT Press, pp. 691–694.
- with Colm Wall and Anthony Clark (1995). "Light Barrier", New Scientist, 29 April.
- (1994). "Awkward Eclipse", New Scientist, 17 December.
- (1994). BBC 'Heretic' series", Times Higher Education Supplement, 12 August.
- with Beverly A. Rubik (1992). "The challenge of consciousness research", Frontier Perspectives, 3(1), pp. 15–19.
- with Fotini Pallikari-Viras (1991). "Biological Utilization of Quantum Nonlocality", Foundations of Physics, 21(2), pp. 197–207 (also available here).
- (1990). "The History of the Discovery of Weakly Coupled Superconductors," in John Roche (ed.), Physicists Look Back: Studies in the History of Physics, CRC Press, p. 375.
- (1988). "Limits to the universality of quantum mechanics", Foundations of Physics, 18(12), December, pp. 1195–1204.
- with M. Conrad and D. Home (1987). "Beyond Quantum Theory: A Realist Psycho-Biological Interpretation of Physical Reality," in Alwyn van der Merwe, Franco Selleri and Gino Tarozzi (eds.), Microphysical Reality and Quantum Formalism, Springer, 1987, p. 285ff.
- with D.E. Broadbent (1981). "Perceptual Experiments and Language Theories", Philosophical Transactions of the Royal Society, 295(10772), October, pp. 375–385.
- with H. M. Hauser (1981). "Multistage Acquisition of Intelligent Behaviour" Archived 20 December 2013 at the Wayback Machine, Kybernetes, 10(1).
- with V. S. Ramachandran (eds.) (1980). Consciousness and the Physical World, Pergamon Press.
- with Richard D. Mattuck, Evan Harris Walker and Olivier Costa de Beauregard (1980). "Parapsychology: An Exchange", New York Review of Books, 27, 26 June, pp. 48–51.
- (1979). "Foreword," in Andrija Puharich (ed.), The Iceland Papers: Select Papers on Experimental and Theoretical Research on the Physics of Consciousness, Essentia Research Associates.
- (1978). "A Theoretical Analysis of Higher States of Consciousness and Meditation", Current Topics in Cybernetics and Systems, pp. 3–4.
- (1974). "The Artificial Intelligence/Psychology Approach to the Study of the Brain and Nervous System", Lecture Notes in Biomathematics, 4, pp. 370–375.
- (1974). "Magnetic field dependence of the surface reactance of superconducting tin at 174 MHz", Journal of Physics F: Metal Physics, 4(5), May, p. 751.
- (1973). "The Discovery of Tunnelling Supercurrents", Science, Nobel lecture, 12 December, pp. 157–164.
- (1969). "Equation of state near the critical point", Journal of Physics C: Solid State Physics, 2(7), July.
- with J. Lekner (1969). "Mobility of an Impurity in a Fermi Liquid", Physical Review Letters. 23(3), pp. 111–113.
- (1967). "Inequality for the specific heat: II. Application to critical phenomena", Proceedings of the Physical Society, 92(2), October.
- (1967). "Inequality for the specific heat: I. Derivation", Proceedings of the Physical Society, 92(2), October.
- (1966). "Macroscopic Field Equations for Metals in Equilibrium", Physical Review, 152, December, pp. 211–217.
- (1966). "Relation between the superfluid density and order parameter for superfluid He near Tc", Physics Letters, 21(6), 1 July, pp. 608–609.
- (1965). "Supercurrents through Barriers", Advances in Physics, 14(56), pp. 419–451.
- (1964). Non-linear conduction in superconductors, (PhD thesis), University of Cambridge, December.
- (1964). "Coupled Superconductors", Review of Modern Physics, 36(1), pp. 216–220.
- (1962). "The Relativistic Shift in the Mössbauer Effect and Coupled Superconductors", submitted for Trinity College fellowship.
- (1962). "Possible new effects in superconductive tunnelling", Physics Letters, 1(7), 1 July, pp. 251–253.
- (1960). "Temperature-dependent shift of gamma rays emitted by a solid", Physical Review Letters, 4, 1 April.

== See also ==
- Josephson voltage standard
- Josephson vortex
- Long Josephson junction
- Pi Josephson junction
- Phi Josephson junction
- List of Jewish Nobel laureates
- List of Nobel laureates in Physics
- List of physicists
- Scientific phenomena named after people
