= Semifluxon =

In superconductivity, a semifluxon is a half integer vortex of supercurrent carrying the magnetic flux equal to the half of the magnetic flux quantum Φ_{0}. Semifluxons exist in the 0-π long Josephson junctions at the boundary between 0 and π regions. This 0-π boundary creates a π discontinuity of the Josephson phase. The junction reacts to this discontinuity by creating a semifluxon. Vortex's supercurrent circulates around 0-π boundary. In addition to semifluxon, there exist also an antisemifluxon. It carries the flux −Φ_{0}/2 and its supercurrent circulates in the opposite direction.

Mathematically, a semifluxon can be constructed by joining two tails of conventional (integer) fluxon (kink of the sine-Gordon equation) at the 0-π boundary. Semifluxon is a particular example of the fractional vortex pinned at the phase discontinuity, see Fractional vortices for details.

For the first time the semifluxons were observed at the tricrystal grain boundaries in d-wave superconductors and later in YBa_{2}Cu_{3}O_{7}–Nb ramp zigzag junctions. In these systems the phase shift of π takes place due to d-wave order parameter symmetry in YBa_{2}Cu_{3}O_{7} superconductor. The observations were performed using low temperature scanning SQUID microscope.

Later, researchers succeeded to fabricate 0-π junctions using conventional low-T_{c} superconductors and ferromagnetic barrier, where the physics is completely different, but the result (0-π junctions) is the same. such 0–π JJs have been demonstrated in SFS and in underdamped SIFS junctions.

Further, physicists were able to demonstrate a molecule made of two interacting semifluxons arranged antiferromagnetically. It has a degenerate ground state up-down or down-up. It was shown that one can readout the state of such a semifluxon molecule by using on-chip SQUIDs. One can also switch between the up-down or down-up states of the molecule by applying the current.

== See also ==
- Josephson junction
- π Josephson junction
- φ Josephson junction
- Fractional vortices
