= Phi Josephson junction =

A φ Josephson junction (pronounced phi Josephson junction) is a particular type of the Josephson junction, which has a non-zero Josephson phase φ across it in the ground state. A π Josephson junction, which has the minimum energy corresponding to the phase of π, is a specific example of it.

== Introduction ==
The Josephson energy $U$ depends on the superconducting phase difference (Josephson phase) $\phi$ periodically, with the period $2\pi$. Therefore, let us focus only on one period, e.g. $-\pi<\phi\leq+\pi$. In the ordinary Josephson junction the dependence $U(\phi)$ has the minimum at $\phi=0$. The function

$$U(\phi) = \frac{\Phi_0 I_c}{2\pi}[1-\cos(\phi)]$$,

where I_{c} is the critical current of the junction, and $\Phi_0$ is the flux quantum, is a good example of conventional $U(\phi)$.

Instead, when the Josephson energy $U(\phi)$ has a minimum (or more than one minimum per period) at $\phi\neq0$, these minimum (minima) correspond to the lowest energy states (ground states) of the junction and one speaks about "φ Josephson junction". Consider two examples.

First, consider the junction with the Josephson energy $U(\phi)$ having two minima at $\phi=\pm\varphi$ within each period, where $\varphi$ (such that $0<\varphi<\pi$) is some number. For example, this is the case for

$U(\phi) = \frac{\Phi_0}{2\pi} \left\{ I_{c1}[1-\cos(\phi)] + \frac{1}{2}I_{c2}[1-\cos(2\phi)]\right\}$,

which corresponds to the current-phase relation

$I_s(\phi) = I_{c1}\sin(\phi) + I_{c2}\sin(2\phi)$.

If $I_{c1}>0$ and $-1/2 < I_{c2} < 0$, the minima of the Josephson energy occur at $\phi=\pm\varphi$, where $\varphi=\arccos\left(-2I_{c1}/I_{c2}\right)$. Note, that the ground state of such a Josephson junction is doubly degenerate because $U(-\varphi)=U(+\varphi)$.

Another example is the junction with the Josephson energy similar to conventional one, but shifted along $\phi$-axis, for example $U(\phi) = \frac{\Phi_0 I_{c}}{2\pi}[1-\cos(\phi-\varphi_0)]$,

and the corresponding current-phase relation

$I_s(\phi) = I_{c}\sin(\phi-\varphi_0)$.

In this case the ground state is $\phi=\varphi_0$ and it is not degenerate.

The above two examples show that the Josephson energy profile in φ Josephson junction can be rather different, resulting in different physical properties. Often, to distinguish, which particular type of the current-phase relation is meant, the researchers are using different names. At the moment there is no well-accepted terminology. However, some researchers use the terminology after Alexandre Buzdin: the Josephson junction with double degenerate ground state $\phi=\pm\varphi$, similar to the first example above, are indeed called φ Josephson junction, while the junction with non-degenerate ground state, similar to the second example above, are called $\varphi_0$ Josephson junctions.

== Realization of φ junctions ==
The first indications of φ junction behavior (degenerate ground states or unconventional temperature dependence of its critical current) were reported in the beginning of the 21st century. These junctions were made of d-wave superconductors.

The first experimental realization of controllable φ junction was reported in September 2012 by the group of Edward Goldobin at University of Tübingen. It is based on a combination of 0 and π segments in one superconducting-insulator-ferromagnetic-superconductor hybrid device and clearly demonstrates two critical currents corresponding to two junction states $\phi=\pm\varphi$. The proposal to construct a φ Josephson junction out of (infinitely) many 0 and π segments has appeared in the works by R. Mints and coauthors, although at that time there was no term φ junction. For the first time the word φ Josephson junction appeared in the work of Buzdin and Koshelev, whose idea was similar. Following this idea, it was further proposed to use a combination of only two 0 and π segments.

In 2016, a $\varphi_0$ junction based on the nanowire quantum dot was reported by the group of Leo Kouwenhoven at Delft University of Technology. The InSb nanowire has strong spin-orbit coupling, and magnetic field was applied leading to Zeeman effect. This combination breaks both inversion and time-reversal symmetries creating finite current at zero phase difference.

Other theoretically proposed realization include geometric φ junctions. There is a theoretical prediction that one can construct the so-called geometric φ junction based on nano-structured d-wave superconductor. As of 2013, this was not demonstrated experimentally.

== Properties of φ junctions ==
- Two critical currents related to the escape (depinning) of the phase from two different wells of the Josephson potential. The lowest critical current can be seen experimentally only at low damping (low temperature). The measurements of the critical current can be used to determine the (unknown) state (+φ or -φ) of φ junction.
- In the case of φ junction constructed out of 0 and π segments, magnetic field can be used to change the asymmetry of the Josephson energy profile up to the point that one of the minima disappears. This allows to prepare the desired state (+φ or -φ). Also, asymmetric periodic Josephson energy potential can be used to construct ratchet-like devices.
- Long φ junctions allow special types of soliton solutions --- the splintered vortices of two types: one carries the magnetic flux Φ_{1}<Φ_{0}, while the other carries the flux Φ_{2}=Φ_{0}−Φ_{1}. Here Φ_{0} is the magnetic flux quantum. These vortices are the solitons of a double sine-Gordon equation. They were observed in d-wave grain boundary junctions.

== Applications ==
- Similar to π Josephson junction, φ junctions can be used as a phase battery.
- Two stable states +φ and -φ can be used to store a digital information. To write the desired state one can apply magnetic field, so that one of the energy minima disappears, so the phase has no choice as to go to the remaining one. To read out an unknown state of the φ junctions one can apply the bias current with value between the two critical currents. If the φ junctions switches to the voltage state, its state was −φ, otherwise, it was +φ. The use of φ junctions as a memory cell (1 bit) was already demonstrated.
- In quantum domain the φ junction can be used as a two-level system (qubit).

== See also ==
- Semifluxon
- Fractional vortices
