= Abrikosov vortex =

Vortex of supercurrent within a type-II superconductor

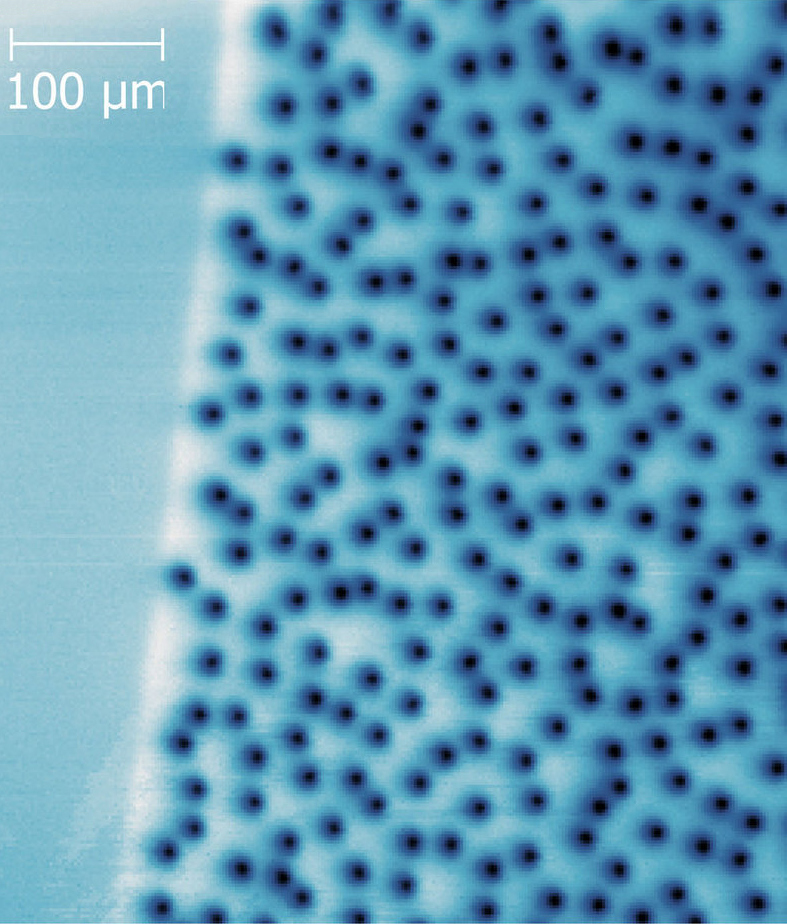
Vortices in a 200-nm-thick YBCO film imaged by scanning SQUID microscopy

In superconductivity, an Abrikosov vortex (also called quantum vortex or a fluxon) is a vortex of supercurrent in a type-II superconductor, used by Soviet physicist Alexei Abrikosov to explain magnetic behavior of type-II superconductors in 1957. Abrikosov vortices occur generically in the Ginzburg–Landau theory of superconductivity.

== Overview ==
The solution is a combination of fluxon solution by Fritz London, combined with a concept of core of quantum vortex by Lars Onsager.

In the quantum vortex_{,} supercurrent circulates around the normal (i.e. non-superconducting) core of the vortex. The core has a size $\sim\xi$ — the superconducting coherence length (parameter of a Ginzburg–Landau theory). The supercurrents decay on the distance about $\lambda$ (London penetration depth) from the core. Note that in type-II superconductors $\lambda>\xi/\sqrt{2}$. The circulating supercurrents induce magnetic fields with the total flux equal to a single flux quantum $\Phi_0$. Therefore, an Abrikosov vortex is often called a fluxon.

The magnetic field distribution of a single vortex far from its core can be described by the same equation as in the London's fluxoid

$B(r) = \frac{\Phi_0}{2\pi\lambda^2}K_0\left(\frac{r}{\lambda}\right) \approx \sqrt{\frac{\lambda}{r}} \exp\left(-\frac{r}{\lambda}\right),$

where $K_0(z)$ is a zeroth-order Bessel function. Note that, according to the above formula, at $r \to 0$ the magnetic field $B(r)\propto\ln(\lambda/r)$, i.e. logarithmically diverges. In reality, for $r\lesssim\xi$ the field is simply given by

$B(0)\approx \frac{\Phi_0}{2\pi\lambda^2}\ln\kappa,$

where κ = λ/ξ is known as the Ginzburg–Landau parameter, which must be $\kappa>1/\sqrt{2}$ in type-II superconductors.

Abrikosov vortices can be trapped in a type-II superconductor by chance, on defects, etc. Even if initially type-II superconductor contains no vortices, and one applies a magnetic field $H$ larger than the lower critical field $H_{c1}$ (but smaller than the upper critical field $H_{c2}$), the field penetrates into superconductor in terms of Abrikosov vortices. Each vortex obeys London's magnetic flux quantization and carries one quantum of magnetic flux $\Phi_0$. Abrikosov vortices form a lattice, usually triangular (of hexagonal symmetry), with the average vortex density (flux density) approximately equal to the externally applied magnetic field. As with other lattices, defects may form as dislocations.

== See also ==
- Macroscopic quantum phenomena
- Nielsen–Olesen vortex
