= Ginzburg–Landau theory =

Superconductivity theory

In physics, Ginzburg–Landau theory, often called Landau–Ginzburg theory, named after Vitaly Ginzburg and Lev Landau, is a mathematical physical theory used to describe superconductivity. In its initial form, it was postulated as a phenomenological model which could describe type-I superconductors without examining their microscopic properties. Alexei Abrikosov later used the theory to describe type-II superconductors as well. One GL-type superconductor is YBCO, and generally all cuprates.

Later, a version of Ginzburg–Landau theory was derived from the Bardeen–Cooper–Schrieffer microscopic theory by Lev Gor'kov, thus showing that it also appears in a limit of the microscopic theory and giving it a microscopic interpretation of all its parameters. The theory can also be given a general geometric setting, placing it in the context of Riemannian geometry, where in many cases exact solutions can be given. This general setting then extends to quantum field theory and string theory, again owing to its solvability, and its close relation to other, similar systems.

Ginzburg was awarded a third of the 2003 Nobel prize in physics for his development of the theory. Abrikosov was awarded another third of this prize for his description of type-II superconductors using the theory.

== Introduction ==
=== Free energy ===
Based on Landau's previously established theory of second-order phase transitions Ginzburg and Landau argued that the free energy density $f_s$ of a superconductor near the superconducting transition can be expressed in terms of a complex order parameter field $\psi(r) = |\psi(r)|e^{i\phi(r)}$, where the quantity $|\psi(r)|^2$ is a measure of the local density of superconducting electrons $n_s(r)$ analogous to a quantum mechanical wave function. In the convention used in this article, the relation is $|\psi(r)|^2=n_s(r)/2$, which is the density of Cooper pairs. While $\psi(r)$ is nonzero below a phase transition into a superconducting state, no direct interpretation of this parameter was given in the original paper. Assuming smallness of $|\psi|$ and smallness of its gradients, the free energy density has the form of a field theory and exhibits U(1) gauge symmetry. In Gaussian units, it is written as

$$f_s = f_n + \alpha(T)|\psi|^2 + \frac{1}{2}\beta(T)|\psi|^4 + \frac{1}{4m}\left|\left(-i\hbar\nabla - \frac{2e}{c}\mathbf{A}\right)\psi\right|^2 + \frac{\mathbf{H}^2}{8\pi},$$

where

- $f_n$ is the free energy density of the normal phase,
- $\alpha(T)$ and $\beta(T)$ are phenomenological parameters that are functions of $T$ (and often written just $\alpha$ and $\beta$).
- $2m$ the mass of a Cooper pair,
- $2e$ is the charge of a Cooper pair,
- $\mathbf{A}$ is the magnetic vector potential, and
- $\mathbf{H}=\nabla \times \mathbf{A}$ is the magnetic field.

The total free energy is given by $F = \int f_s d^3r$.

=== Ginzburg–Landau equations ===
By minimizing $F$ with respect to variations in the order parameter $\psi$ and the vector potential $\mathbf{A}$, one arrives at the Ginzburg–Landau equations:

$$\alpha \psi + \beta |\psi|^2 \psi + \frac{1}{4m} \left(-i\hbar\nabla - \frac{2e}{c}\mathbf{A} \right)^2 \psi = 0$$

$$\nabla \times \mathbf{H} = \frac{4\pi}{c}\mathbf{J}, \qquad \mathbf{J} = -\frac{ie\hbar}{2m}\left(\psi^*\nabla\psi-\psi\nabla\psi^*\right) - \frac{2e^2}{mc}\left|\psi\right|^2\mathbf{A},$$

where $\mathbf{J}$ denotes the dissipation-free electric current density, or supercurrent density. The first equation, which bears some similarities to the time-independent Schrödinger equation but is principally different due to a nonlinear term, determines the order parameter, $\psi$. The second equation is instead Maxwell-like and provides the superconducting current and the magnetic field.

Additionally, the boundary condition at the surface of the superconductor can be determined to be

$$\mathbf{n}\left( -i\hbar\nabla - \frac{2e}{c}\mathbf{A} \right)\left. \psi \right|_b = 0,$$

where $\mathbf{n}$ is the vector normal to the surface and $b$ denotes the location of the boundary.

Close to the superconducting transition, it is assumed that $\beta(T)$ is a positive constant and that
$$\alpha(T)=a\frac{T-T_C}{T_C},$$
where $a$ is a positive constant and $T_C$ is the critical temperature.

=== Simple interpretation ===
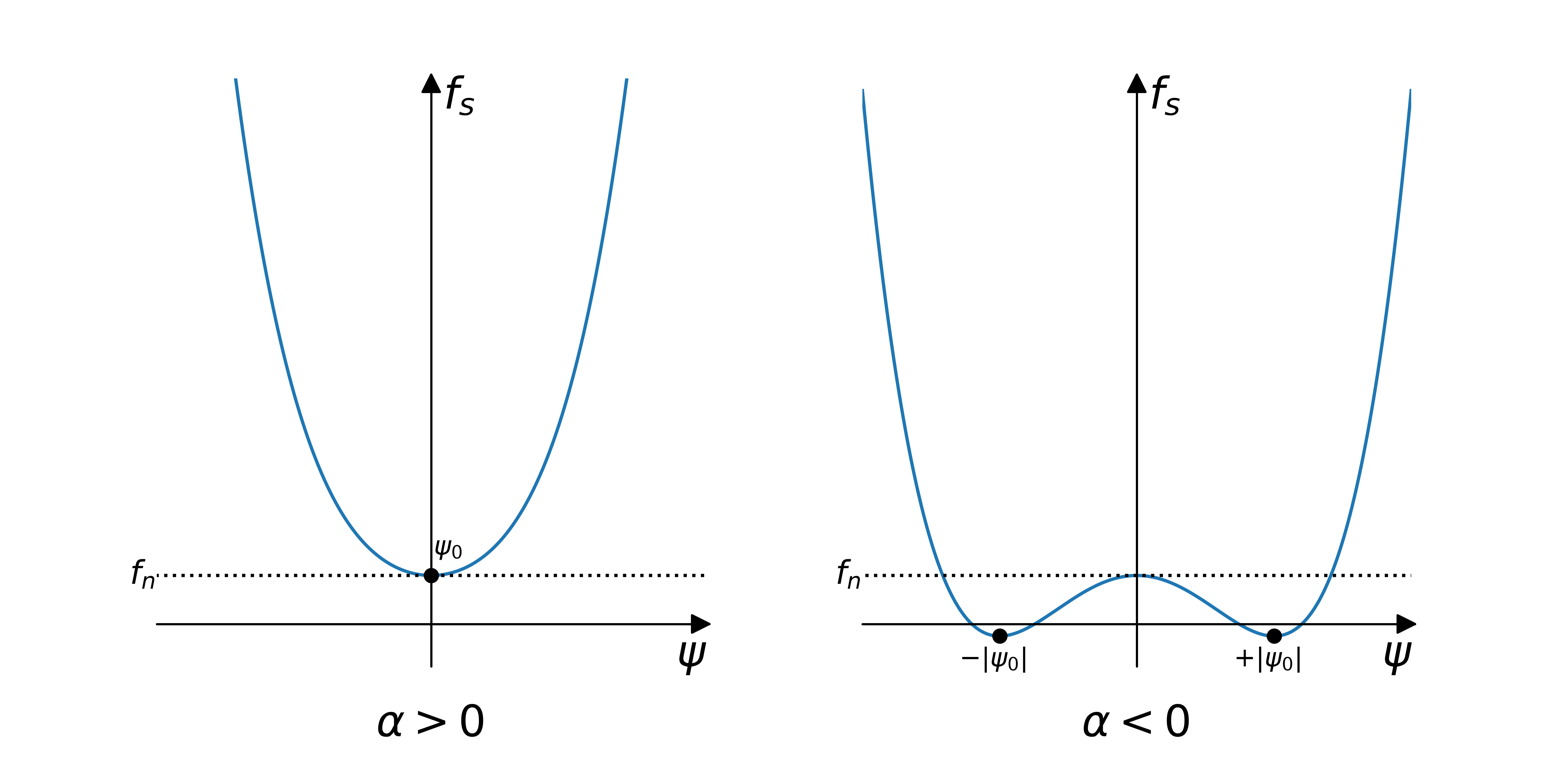
Visualization of the free energy density of the Ginzburg–Landau theory as a function of a real order parameter above the critical temperature (left) and below the critical temperature (right).

Consider a homogeneous superconductor where $\psi(\mathbf{r})$ is constant and there is no external magnetic field. The equation for the free energy then simplifies to
$$f_s=f_n+\alpha(T)|\psi|^2+\frac{1}{2}\beta|\psi|^4.$$
The equilibrium order parameter is found by minimizing this equation with respect to $\psi$.

Above the critical temperature, $\alpha(T)$ is positive and the only minimum is given by $\psi=0$. This corresponds to the absence of superconductivity.

Below the superconducting transition, $\alpha(T)$ is negative, and the minima are given by
$$|\psi_0|^2 = - \frac\alpha \beta.$$
The density of electrons participating in the supercurrent $n_s$ is given by
$$|\psi|^2=\frac{1}{2}n_s.$$
Thus, this corresponds to the superconducting phase.

== Characteristic quantities ==
=== Coherence length and penetration depth ===
The Ginzburg–Landau equations predicts two characteristic lengths in a superconductor. The first characteristic length is termed coherence length. In one dimension at zero magnetic field, the first GL equation becomes
$$\alpha \psi + \beta |\psi|^2\psi - \frac{\hbar^2}{4m}\frac{d^2\psi}{dx^2} = 0.$$
At an interface between a superconductor and a normal conductor, this equation is solved by
$$\psi(x)=\sqrt{\frac{\alpha}{\beta}} \tanh\left(\frac{x}{\xi\sqrt{2}}\right),$$
where
$$\xi\equiv\sqrt{\frac{\hbar^2}{4m|\alpha|}}$$
is the coherence length. This length scale also sets the exponential law according to which small perturbations of density of superconducting electrons recover their equilibrium value $\psi_0$.

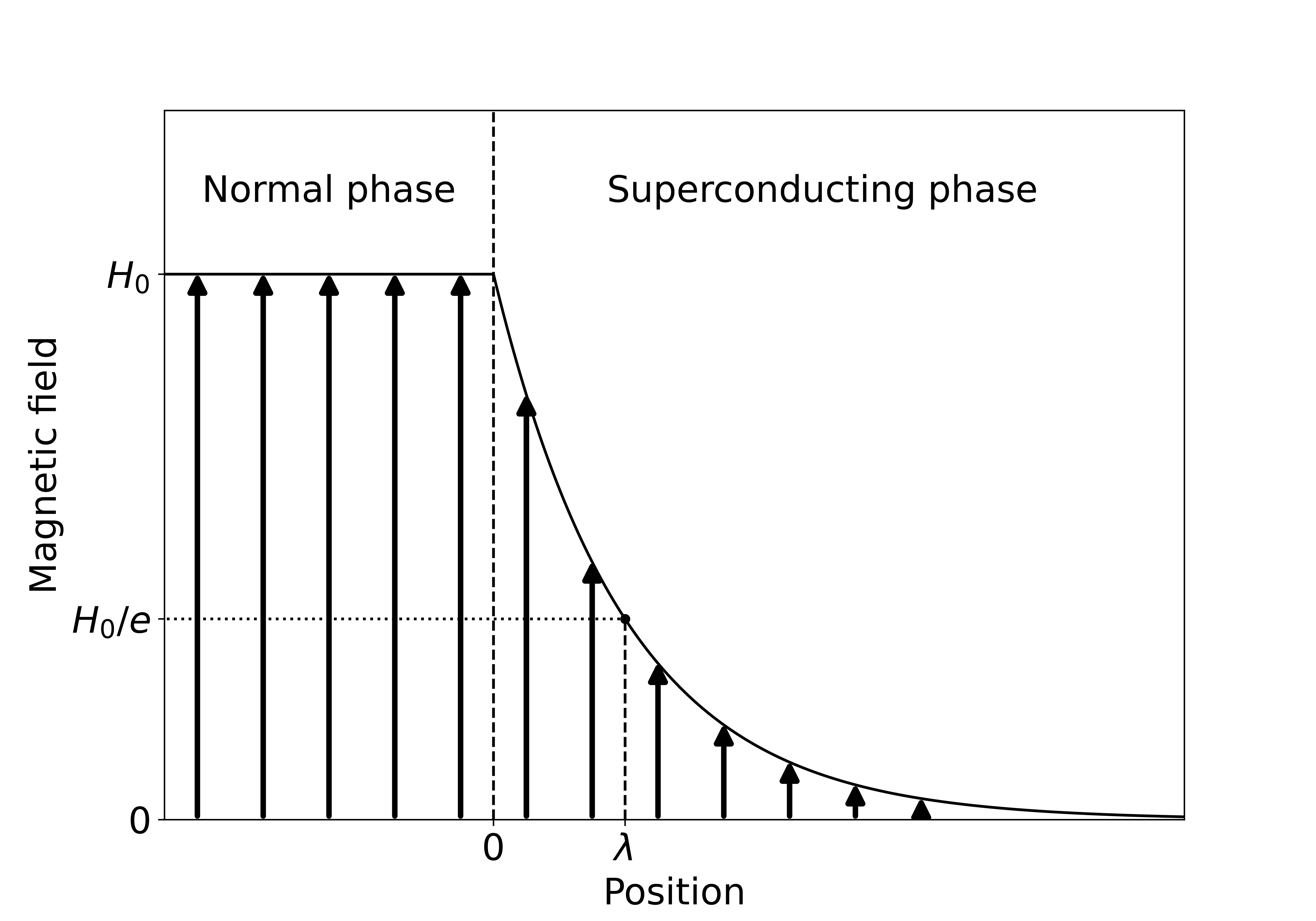
The magnetic field strength as a function of position at the boundary between a normal conductor and a superconductor given an external magnetic field $H_0$.

The second length scale is the penetration depth. Consider an external magnetic field $H_0$ applied to a semi-infinite superconducting slab. Assuming that $\psi=\psi_0$ is constant on the length scale we are considering, (Note: That is, assuming that the coherence length is large.) the second GL equation becomes
$$\frac{d^2A_y}{dx^2}=\frac{8\pi e^2}{mc^2}|\psi|^2A_y.$$
This is equation is solved for the magnetic field by
$$H=H_0e^{-x/\lambda},$$
where
$$\lambda\equiv\sqrt{\frac{mc^2}{8\pi e^2|\psi|^2}}=\sqrt{\frac{mc^2}{8\pi e^2}\frac{\beta}{\alpha}}$$
is the penetration depth. By identifying the order parameter with the density of superconducting electrons, it becomes apparent that this is equivalent to the penetration depth in the London theory.

The ratio between these two length scales,
$$\kappa\equiv\frac{\lambda}{\xi}=\sqrt{\frac{\beta c^2 m^2}{2\pi e^2 \hbar^2}}$$
is called the Ginzburg–Landau parameter. The importance of this property is that it distinguishes between type I and type II superconductors; superconductors for which $\kappa<1/\sqrt{2}$ are of type I, and those for which $\kappa>1/\sqrt{2}$ are of type II.

=== Critical magnetic field ===
To calculate the magnetic field $H_\text{cm}$ above which superconductivity is destroyed in the bulk, $\psi$ is considered to be constant and in equilibrium. Using these assumptions, the free energy is
$$f_s-f_n=\alpha|\psi_0|^2+\frac{1}{2}\beta|\psi_0|^4+\frac{\mathbf{H}^2}{8\pi} = -\frac{\alpha^2}{2\beta} + \frac{\mathbf{H}^2}{8\pi}.$$
At the phase transition, the free energies of the normal and superconducting phases should be equal. This gives
$$H_\text{cm}^2 = \frac{4\pi\alpha^2}{\beta}.$$

=== Dimensionless form of the Ginzburg–Landau equations ===
In Gaussian units, the GL equations read
$$\alpha \psi + \beta |\psi|^2 \psi + \frac{1}{4m} \left(-i\hbar\nabla - \frac{2e}{c}\mathbf{A} \right)^2 \psi = 0$$

$$\nabla \times \mathbf{H} = \frac{4\pi}{c}\mathbf{J}, \qquad \mathbf{J} = -\frac{ie\hbar}{2m}\left(\psi^*\nabla\psi-\psi\nabla\psi^*\right) - \frac{2e^2}{mc}\left|\psi\right|^2\mathbf{A},$$
with the boundary condition
$$\mathbf{n}\left( -i\hbar\nabla - \frac{2e}{c}\mathbf{A} \right)\left. \psi \right|_b = 0.$$

By changing to a unit system which is defined by the characteristic quantities, the equations can be made dimensionless. For this, the units become
$$\psi'=\frac{\psi}{\psi_0}, \qquad \mathbf{r}'=\frac{\mathbf{r}}{\lambda},\qquad \mathbf{H}'=\frac{\mathbf{H}}{H_\text{cm}\sqrt{2}}.$$

Then, the GL equations become dimensionless:
$$\left(-\frac{i\nabla}{\kappa}-\mathbf{A}\right)^2\psi - \psi + |\psi|^2\psi=0,$$
$$\nabla \times (\nabla \times \mathbf{A}) = -\frac{i}{2\kappa}\left( \psi^*\nabla\psi - \psi \nabla \psi^* \right) - |\psi|^2\mathbf{A},$$
with the boundary condition
$$\mathbf{n}\left( -\frac{i\nabla}{\kappa}-\mathbf{A} \right) \psi|_b = 0.$$

In this unit system, the equations then depend only on the Ginzburg–Landau parameter $\kappa$.

== Applications ==
=== Thin films ===
One of the systems that can be analysed with the GL theory is a thin film. Consider a type-I ($\kappa \ll 1$) superconducting film extending infinitely far in the y- and z-directions, with a thickness $d\ll \lambda$. In addition, an external magnetic field $H_0$ is applied in the z-direction.

By symmetry, only derivatives to x can be nonzero. This means that the gauge of the vector potential can be chosen such that
$$\mathbf{A}=A(x)\hat{y},\qquad \mathbf{H}(x)=\frac{dA(x)}{dx}\hat{z}.$$
Using this gauge, and choosing $\psi$ to be real, the first dimensionless GL equations becomes
$$\frac{d^2\psi}{dx^2}=\kappa^2 \psi(A^2-1+\psi^2).$$

Because of the assumption that the superconductor is of type-I, it is reasonable to assume that $\psi$ is approximately constant over the thickness of the thin film. The second GL equation then becomes
$$\frac{d^2A}{dx^2}=\psi^2 A.$$

By using that the magnetic field must be continuous at the boundary, i.e. $H(\pm d/2)=H_0$, the solution to for the magnetic field is
$$H=H_0\frac{\cosh(\psi x)}{\cosh(\psi d /2)}.$$

In the second-order approximation of the first GL equation, the relation between $\psi$ and $H_0$ can be found to be
$$H_0^2 = \frac{2\psi^2(1-\psi^2)\cosh^2(\frac{1}{2}d\psi)}{[\sinh(d\psi)/(d\psi)]-1}
\approx \frac{12(1-\psi^2)}{d^2}.$$

In this system, the difference in the free energies of the superconducting and normal state is
$$\int_{-\frac{1}{2}d}^{\frac{1}{2}d}f_s-f_n\,dx=\frac{H_\text{cm}^2}{4\pi}\int_{-\frac{1}{2}d}^{\frac{1}{2}d}\left[ -\psi^2+\frac{1}{2}\psi^4 +(H-H_0)^2+A^2\psi^2\right]\,dx.$$

Using the expression for $H_0$ and that at the critical magnetic field, this has to be zero. Therefore, $H_c^2=\frac{\psi^2(2-\psi^2)}{2\left( 1-\frac{\tanh(\frac{1}{2}d\psi)}{\frac{1}{2}d\psi} \right)}\approx \frac{6(2-\psi^2)}{d^2}.$

At the transition point, $|\psi|^2=0$, so
$$H_c=\frac{2\sqrt{6}}{d}=2\sqrt{6}\frac{\lambda}{d}H_\text{cm}.$$

Therefore, the critical magnetic field is higher for a thin film than for a bulk superconductor. Moreover, it can be derived that for a thin film, the phase transition between the normal and superconducting phase is of second order, while it is of first order in a bulk material. This change in the order of the phase transition happens for $d=\sqrt{5}\lambda$.

=== Flux quantization ===
The order parameter can be written in terms of the modulus and the phase as $\psi=|\psi|e^{i\phi}$. The supercurrent is then
$$\mathbf{j}=\frac{\hbar e}{m}|\psi|^2\left(\nabla\phi-\frac{2e}{\hbar c}\mathbf{A}\right).$$

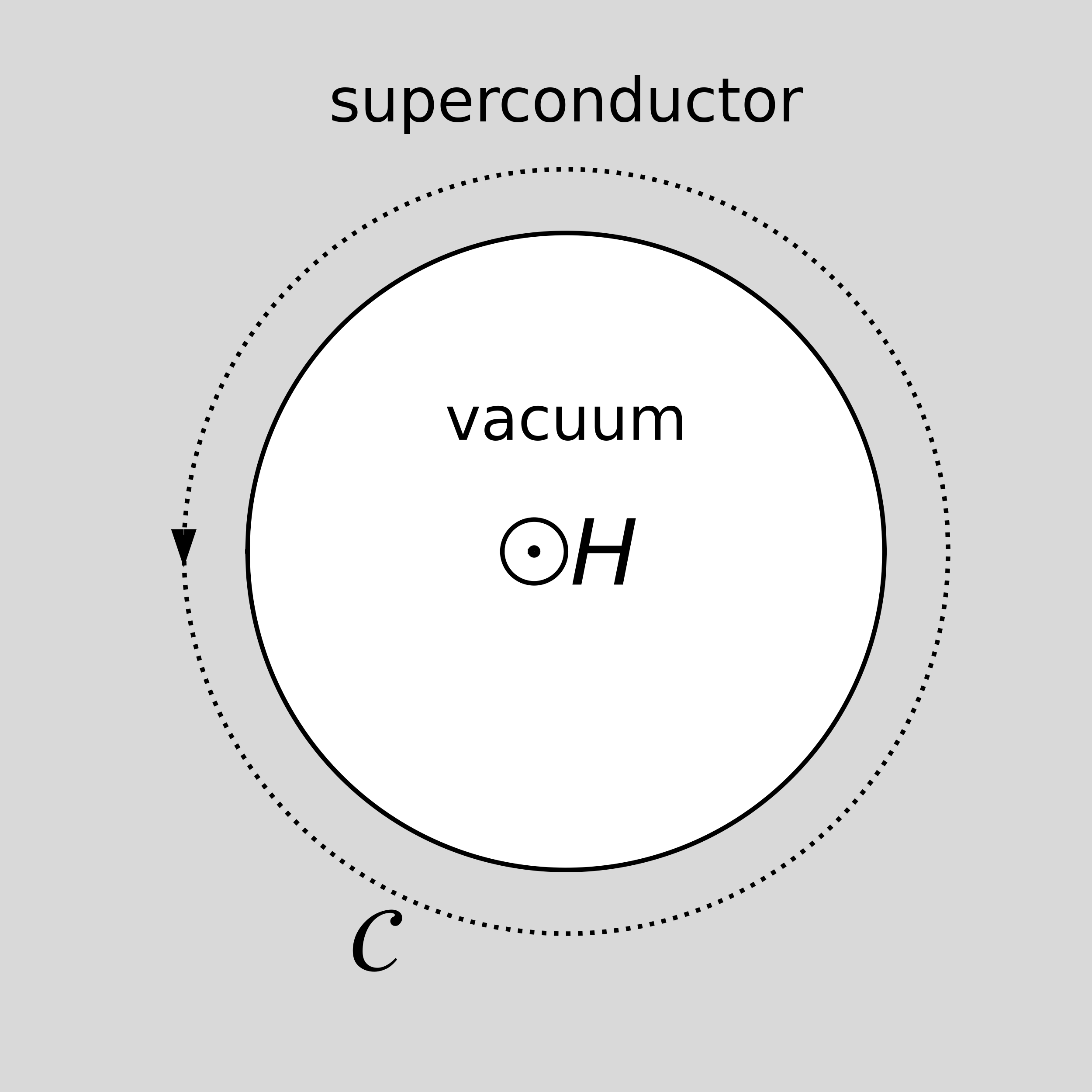
The setup for the derivation of magnetic flux quantization, showing the external magnetic field inside the hollow superconductor and the integration contour $\mathcal{C}$.

Now consider a hollow superconducting cylinder that encloses a non-superconducting material. In the non-superconducting region, and external magnetic field $\mathbf{H}$ is applied. Integrating the supercurrent over a contour inside the hollow cylinder that encloses the non-superconducting region, one gets
$$\oint_\mathcal{C} \mathbf{j}\, d\mathbf{l}=|\psi|^2 \frac{\hbar e}{m}\left( \oint_\mathcal{C} \nabla \phi \, d\mathbf{l} - \frac{2e}{\hbar c}\oint_\mathcal{C}\mathbf{A}\,d\mathbf{l} \right)$$

Inside the wall, there is no current and the first integral vanishes. From electromagnetism, it is known that
$$\oint_\mathcal{C} \mathbf{A}\, d\mathbf{l}=\int_\mathcal{C}\mathbf{H}\,d\mathbf{S}=\Phi,$$
where $\Phi$ is the magnetic flux. Finally, the first integral on the left side is constrained by the fact that $\psi$ must be a single-valued function. Because $e^{ix}=e^{ix+2\pi n}$ for any integer $n$,
$$\oint_\mathcal{C} \nabla \phi d\mathbf{l}=2\pi n.$$

Putting it together, these constraints imply that
$$\frac{2e}{\hbar c}\Phi \equiv 2\pi \frac{\Phi}{\Phi_0} = 2\pi n.$$

Thus, the flux inside a hollow cylinder can only be a multiple of the magnetic flux quantum $\Phi_0=\pi\hbar c /e$. This phenomenon is known as flux quantization.

=== Fluctuations ===
The phase transition from the normal state is of second order for Type II superconductors, taking into account fluctuations, as demonstrated by Dasgupta and Halperin, while for Type I superconductors it is of first order, as demonstrated by Halperin, Lubensky and Ma.

=== Classification of superconductors ===
In the original paper Ginzburg and Landau observed the existence of two types of superconductors depending on the energy of the interface between the normal and superconducting states. The Meissner state breaks down when the applied magnetic field is too large. Superconductors can be divided into two classes according to how this breakdown occurs. In Type I superconductors, superconductivity is abruptly destroyed when the strength of the applied field rises above a critical value H_{c}. Depending on the geometry of the sample, one may obtain an intermediate state consisting of a pattern of regions of normal material carrying a magnetic field mixed with regions of superconducting material containing no field. In Type II superconductors, raising the applied field past a critical value H_{c1} leads to a mixed state (also known as the vortex state) in which an increasing amount of magnetic flux penetrates the material, but there remains no resistance to the flow of electric current as long as the current is not too large. At a second critical field strength H_{c2}, superconductivity is destroyed. The mixed state is actually caused by vortices in the electronic superfluid, sometimes called fluxons because the flux carried by these vortices is quantized. Most pure elemental superconductors, except niobium and carbon nanotubes, are Type I, while almost all impure and compound superconductors are Type II.

The most important finding from Ginzburg–Landau theory was made by Alexei Abrikosov in 1957. He used Ginzburg–Landau theory to explain experiments on superconducting alloys and thin films. He found that in a type-II superconductor in a high magnetic field, the field penetrates in a triangular lattice of quantized tubes of flux vortices.

== Geometric formulation ==
The Ginzburg–Landau functional can be formulated in the general setting of a complex vector bundle over a compact Riemannian manifold. This is the same functional as given above, transposed to the notation commonly used in Riemannian geometry. In multiple interesting cases, it can be shown to exhibit the same phenomena as the above, including Abrikosov vortices (see discussion below).

For a complex vector bundle $E$ over a Riemannian manifold $M$ with fiber $\Complex^n$, the order parameter $\psi$ is understood as a section of the vector bundle $E$. The Ginzburg–Landau functional is then a Lagrangian for that section:

$$\mathcal{L}(\psi, A) =
\int_M \sqrt{|g|} dx^1 \wedge \dotsm \wedge dx^m \left[
\vert F \vert^2 + \vert D \psi\vert^2 + \frac{1}{4} \left(\sigma - \vert\psi\vert^2\right)^2
\right]$$

The notation used here is as follows. The fibers $\Complex^n$ are assumed to be equipped with a Hermitian inner product $\langle\cdot,\cdot\rangle$ so that the square of the norm is written as $\vert\psi\vert^2 = \langle\psi,\psi\rangle$. The phenomenological parameters $\alpha$ and $\beta$ have been absorbed so that the potential energy term is a quartic mexican hat potential; i.e., exhibiting spontaneous symmetry breaking, with a minimum at some real value $\sigma\in\R$. The integral is explicitly over the volume form

$$*(1) = \sqrt{|g|} dx^1 \wedge \dotsm \wedge dx^m$$

for an $m$-dimensional manifold $M$ with determinant $|g|$ of the metric tensor $g$.

The $D = d + A$ is the connection one-form and $F$ is the corresponding curvature 2-form (this is not the same as the free energy $F$ given up top; here, $F$ corresponds to the electromagnetic field strength tensor). The $A$ corresponds to the vector potential, but is in general non-Abelian when $n> 1$, and is normalized differently. In physics, one conventionally writes the connection as $d-ieA$ for the electric charge $e$ and vector potential $A$; in Riemannian geometry, it is more convenient to drop the $e$ (and all other physical units) and take $A = A_\mu dx^\mu$ to be a one-form taking values in the Lie algebra corresponding to the symmetry group of the fiber. Here, the symmetry group is SU(n), as that leaves the inner product $\langle\cdot,\cdot\rangle$ invariant; so here, $A$ is a form taking values in the algebra $\mathfrak{su}(n)$.

The curvature $F$ generalizes the electromagnetic field strength to the non-Abelian setting, as the curvature form of an affine connection on a vector bundle . It is conventionally written as

$$\begin{align}
F = D \circ D = dA + A \wedge A = \left(\frac{\partial A_\nu}{\partial x^\mu} + A_\mu A_\nu\right) dx^\mu \wedge dx^\nu = \frac{1}{2} \left(\frac{\partial A_\nu}{\partial x^\mu} - \frac{\partial A_\mu}{\partial x^\nu} + [A_\mu, A_\nu]\right) dx^\mu \wedge dx^\nu \\
\end{align}$$

That is, each $A_\mu$ is an $n \times n$ skew-symmetric matrix. (See the article on the metric connection for additional articulation of this specific notation.) To emphasize this, note that the first term of the Ginzburg–Landau functional, involving the field-strength only, is

$$\mathcal{L}(A) = YM(A) = \int_M *(1) \vert F \vert^2$$

which is just the Yang–Mills action on a compact Riemannian manifold.

The Euler–Lagrange equations for the Ginzburg–Landau functional are the Yang–Mills equations

$$D^*D\psi = \frac{1}{2}\left(\sigma - \vert\psi\vert^2\right)\psi$$

and

$$D^*F = -\operatorname{Re}\langle D\psi, \psi\rangle$$

where $D^*$ is the adjoint of $D$, analogous to the codifferential $\delta = d^*$. Note that these are closely related to the Yang–Mills–Higgs equations.

=== Specific results ===
In string theory, it is conventional to study the Ginzburg–Landau functional for the manifold $M$ being a Riemann surface, and taking $n = 1$; i.e., a line bundle. The phenomenon of Abrikosov vortices persists in these general cases, including $M=\R^2$, where one can specify any finite set of points where $\psi$ vanishes, including multiplicity. The proof generalizes to arbitrary Riemann surfaces and to Kähler manifolds. In the limit of weak coupling, it can be shown that $\vert\psi\vert$ converges uniformly to 1, while $D\psi$ and $dA$ converge uniformly to zero, and the curvature becomes a sum over delta-function distributions at the vortices. The sum over vortices, with multiplicity, just equals the degree of the line bundle; as a result, one may write a line bundle on a Riemann surface as a flat bundle, with N singular points and a covariantly constant section.

When the manifold is four-dimensional, possessing a spin^{c} structure, then one may write a very similar functional, the Seiberg–Witten functional, which may be analyzed in a similar fashion, and which possesses many similar properties, including self-duality. When such systems are integrable, they are studied as Hitchin systems.

=== Self-duality ===
When the manifold $M$ is a Riemann surface $M=\Sigma$, the functional can be re-written so as to explicitly show self-duality. One achieves this by writing the exterior derivative as a sum of Dolbeault operators $d=\partial+\overline\partial$. Likewise, the space $\Omega^1$ of one-forms over a Riemann surface decomposes into a space that is holomorphic, and one that is anti-holomorphic: $\Omega^1=\Omega^{1,0}\oplus\Omega^{0,1}$, so that forms in $\Omega^{1,0}$ are holomorphic in $z$ and have no dependence on $\overline z$; and vice-versa for $\Omega^{0,1}$. This allows the vector potential to be written as $A=A^{1,0}+A^{0,1}$ and likewise $D=\partial_A + \overline\partial_A$ with $\partial_A=\partial+A^{1,0}$ and $\overline\partial_A=\overline\partial+A^{0,1}$.

For the case of $n=1$, where the fiber is $\Complex$ so that the bundle is a line bundle, the field strength can similarly be written as

$$F=-\left(\partial_A \overline\partial_A + \overline\partial_A \partial_A\right)$$

Note that in the sign-convention being used here, both $A^{1,0}, A^{0,1}$ and $F$ are purely imaginary (viz U(1) is generated by $e^{i\theta}$ so derivatives are purely imaginary). The functional then becomes

$$\mathcal{L}\left(\psi,A\right)=
2\pi\sigma \operatorname{deg} L +
\int_\Sigma \frac{i}{2} dz \wedge d\overline z
\left[2 \vert\overline\partial_A\psi\vert^2 +
\left(*(-iF) - \frac{1}{2} (\sigma - \vert\psi\vert^2 \right)^2 \right]$$

The integral is understood to be over the volume form

$$*(1) = \frac{i}{2} dz \wedge d\overline z$$,

so that

$$\operatorname{Area}\Sigma = \int_\Sigma *(1)$$

is the total area of the surface $\Sigma$. The $*$ is the Hodge star, as before. The degree $\operatorname{deg} L$ of the line bundle $L$ over the surface $\Sigma$ is

$$\operatorname{deg}L = c_1(L) = \frac{1}{2\pi} \int_\Sigma iF$$

where $c_1(L) = c_1(L)[\Sigma]\in H^2(\Sigma)$ is the first Chern class.

The Lagrangian is minimized (stationary) when $\psi,A$ solve the Ginzberg–Landau equations

$$\begin{align}
\overline\partial_A \psi &= 0 \\
*(iF) &= \frac{1}{2} \left(\sigma - \vert\psi\vert^2 \right) \\
\end{align}$$

Note that these are both first-order differential equations, manifestly self-dual. Integrating the second of these, one quickly finds that a non-trivial solution must obey

$$4\pi \operatorname{deg}L \le \sigma \operatorname{Area} \Sigma$$.

Roughly speaking, this can be interpreted as an upper limit to the density of the Abrikosov vortices. One can also show that the solutions are bounded; one must have $|\psi|\le\sigma$.

== In string theory ==
In particle physics, any quantum field theory with a unique classical vacuum state and a potential energy with a degenerate critical point is called a Landau–Ginzburg theory. The generalization to N = (2,2) supersymmetric theories in 2 spacetime dimensions was proposed by Cumrun Vafa and Nicholas Warner in November 1988; in this generalization one imposes that the superpotential possess a degenerate critical point. The same month, together with Brian Greene they argued that these theories are related by a renormalization group flow to sigma models on Calabi–Yau manifolds. In his 1993 paper "Phases of N = 2 theories in two-dimensions", Edward Witten argued that Landau–Ginzburg theories and sigma models on Calabi–Yau manifolds are different phases of the same theory. A construction of such a duality was given by relating the Gromov–Witten theory of Calabi–Yau orbifolds to FJRW theory an analogous Landau–Ginzburg "FJRW" theory. Witten's sigma models were later used to describe the low energy dynamics of 4-dimensional gauge theories with monopoles as well as brane constructions.

== See also ==
- Time-dependent Ginzburg-Landau equations
- Flux pinning
- Gross–Pitaevskii equation
- Landau theory
- Stuart–Landau equation
- Reaction–diffusion systems
- Quantum vortex
- Higgs bundle
- Bogomol'nyi–Prasad–Sommerfield bound
