= Magnetic flux quantum =

Quantized unit of magnetic flux

The magnetic flux through some contour is defined as the magnetic field multiplied by the loop area. In some physical systems, such as in superconductors, the magnetic flux can only take certain fixed (or, quantized) values. The values allowed to be taken by the magnetic flux are integer multiples of the magnetic flux quantum. (Note: The magnetic flux can be different for different systems. In superconductors, for instance, the flux quantum is half the Dirac magnetic flux quantum because Cooper pairs have a charge of $2e$.) This restriction on the values of the magnetic flux is called magnetic flux quantization.

The quantization of the magnetic flux originates from the requirement that the wave function describing a particle must be single-valued. Because a magnetic field induces a phase shift in the wave function when integrating on a closed contour, the wave function can only remain single-valued if the magnetic flux takes on a quantized value for which the phase shift is equal to $2\pi$.

The phenomenon of flux quantization was predicted first by Fritz London then within the Aharonov–Bohm effect and later discovered experimentally in superconductors.

== Superconducting magnetic flux quantum ==
CODATA values		Units
Φ_{0}	2.067833848...×10^{−15}	Wb
K_{J}	483597.8484...×10^{9}	Hz/V

If one deals with a superconducting ring (i.e. a closed loop path in a superconductor) or a hole in a bulk superconductor, the magnetic flux threading such a hole/loop is quantized.

The (superconducting) magnetic flux quantum Φ_{0} = h/(2e) ≈ 2.067833848...×10^{−15} Wb is a combination of fundamental physical constants: the Planck constant h and the electron charge e. Its value is, therefore, the same for any superconductor.

To understand this definition in the context of the Dirac flux quantum, one considers that the supercurrent in a superconductor is carried by Cooper pairs which have twice the charge of an electron $q = 2e$.

The phenomenon of flux quantization was first discovered in superconductors experimentally by B. S. Deaver and W. M. Fairbank, and independently by R. Doll and M. Näbauer, in 1961. The quantization of magnetic flux is closely related to the Little–Parks effect, but was predicted earlier by Fritz London in 1948 using the London equations, a phenomenological model of superconductivity.

=== Derivation ===
The following physical equations use SI units. In CGS units, a factor of c would appear.

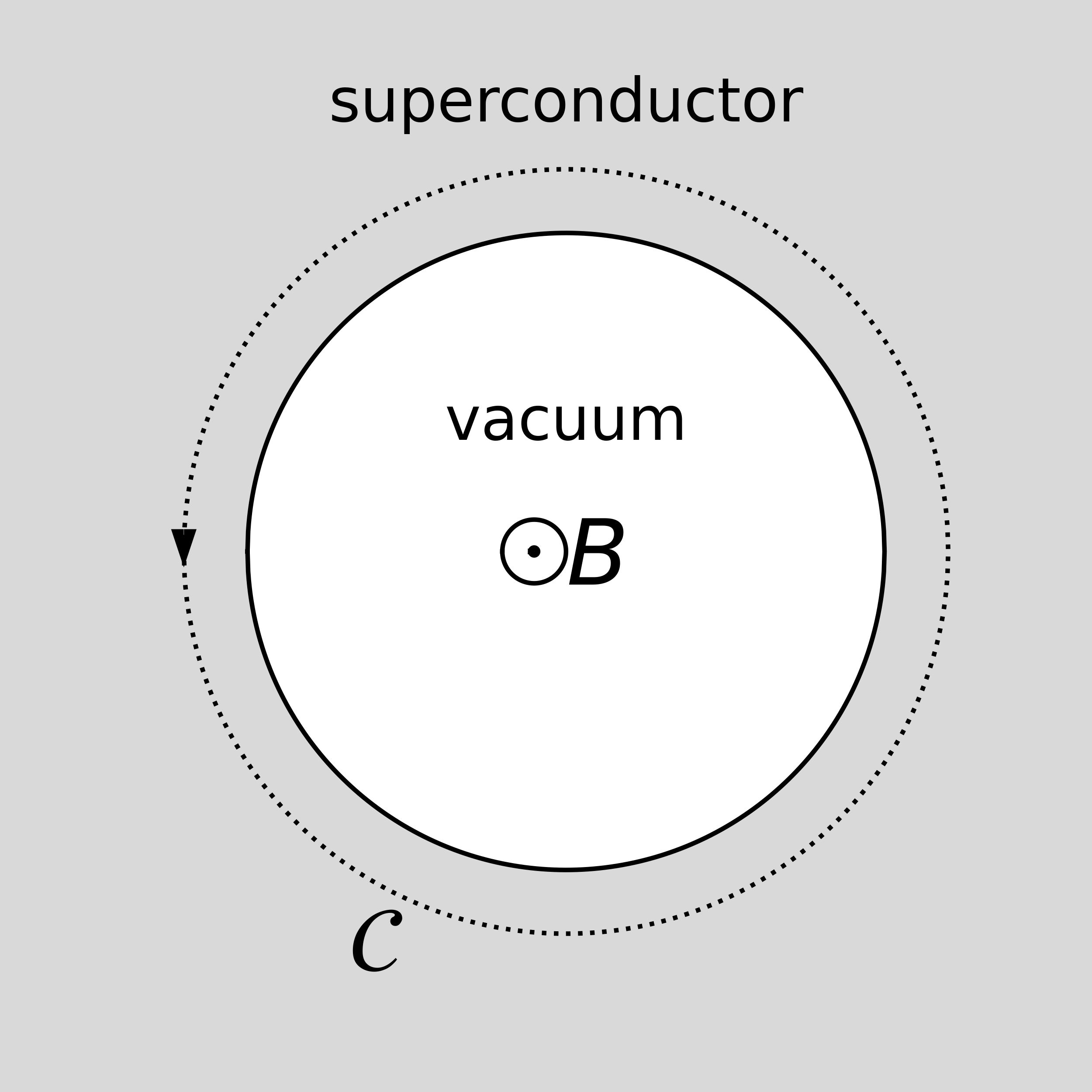
The setup for the derivation of magnetic flux quantization, showing the external magnetic field inside the hollow superconductor and the integration contour $\mathcal{C}$.

The superconducting properties in each point of the superconductor are described by the complex quantum mechanical wave function Ψ(r, t) – the superconducting order parameter. As with any complex function, Ψ can be written as Ψ = Ψ_{0}e^{iθ}, where Ψ_{0} is the amplitude and θ is the phase. Changing the phase θ by 2πn will not change Ψ and, correspondingly, will not change any physical properties. However, in the superconductor of non-trivial topology, e.g. superconductor with the hole or superconducting loop/cylinder, the phase θ may continuously change from some value θ_{0} to the value θ_{0} + 2πn as one goes around the hole/loop and comes to the same starting point. If this is so, then one has n magnetic flux quanta trapped in the hole/loop, as shown below:

Per minimal coupling, the current density of Cooper pairs in the superconductor is:
$$\mathbf J = \frac{1}{2m} \left[\left(\Psi^* (-i\hbar\nabla) \Psi - \Psi (-i\hbar\nabla) \Psi^*\right) - 2q \mathbf{A} |\Psi|^2 \right] .$$
where q = 2e is the charge of the Cooper pair. The wave function is the Ginzburg–Landau order parameter:
$$\Psi(\mathbf{r})=\sqrt{\rho(\mathbf{r})} \, e^{i\theta(\mathbf{r})}.$$

Plugged into the expression of the current, one obtains:
$$\mathbf{J} = \frac{\hbar}{m} \left(\nabla{\theta}- \frac{q}{\hbar} \mathbf{A}\right)\rho.$$

Inside the body of the superconductor, the current density J is zero, and therefore
$$\nabla{\theta} = \frac{q}{\hbar} \mathbf{A}.$$

Integrating around the hole/loop using Stokes' theorem and ∇ × A = B gives:
$$\Phi_B = \oint\mathbf{A}\cdot d\mathbf{l} = \frac{\hbar}{q} \oint\nabla{\theta}\cdot d\mathbf{l}.$$

Now, because the order parameter must return to the same value when the integral goes back to the same point, we have:
$$\Phi_B=\frac{\hbar}{q} 2\pi = \frac{h}{2e}.$$

Due to the Meissner effect, the magnetic induction B inside the superconductor is zero. More exactly, magnetic field H penetrates into a superconductor over a small distance called the London penetration depth (denoted λ_{L} and usually ≈ 100 nm). The screening currents also flow in this λ_{L}-layer near the surface, creating magnetization M inside the superconductor, which perfectly compensates the applied field H, thus resulting in B = 0 inside the superconductor.

The magnetic flux frozen in a loop/hole (plus its λ_{L}-layer) will always be quantized. However, the value of the flux quantum is equal to Φ_{0} only when the path/trajectory around the hole described above can be chosen so that it lays in the superconducting region without screening currents, i.e. several λ_{L} away from the surface. There are geometries where this condition cannot be satisfied, e.g. a loop made of very thin (≤ λ_{L}) superconducting wire or the cylinder with the similar wall thickness. In the latter case, the flux has a quantum different from Φ_{0}.

The flux quantization is a key idea behind a SQUID, which is one of the most sensitive magnetometers available.

Flux quantization also plays an important role in the physics of type II superconductors. When such a superconductor (now without any holes) is placed in a magnetic field with the strength between the first critical field H_{c1} and the second critical field H_{c2}, the field partially penetrates into the superconductor in a form of Abrikosov vortices. The Abrikosov vortex consists of a normal core – a cylinder of the normal (non-superconducting) phase with a diameter on the order of the ξ, the superconducting coherence length. The normal core plays a role of a hole in the superconducting phase. The magnetic field lines pass along this normal core through the whole sample. The screening currents circulate in the λ_{L}-vicinity of the core and screen the rest of the superconductor from the magnetic field in the core. In total, each such Abrikosov vortex carries one quantum of magnetic flux Φ_{0}.

=== Josephson constant ===
The inverse of the flux quantum, $1/\Phi_0$, is called the Josephson constant, and is denoted $K_J$. It is the constant of proportionality of the Josephson effect, relating the potential difference across a Josephson junction to the frequency of the irradiation. The Josephson effect is very widely used to provide a standard for high-precision measurements of potential difference, which (from 1990 to 2019) were related to a fixed, conventional value of the Josephson constant, denoted K_{J-90}. With the 2019 revision of the SI, the Josephson constant has an exact value of K_{J} = 483597.84841698... GHz⋅V^{−1}.

== Measuring the magnetic flux ==
Prior to the 2019 revision of the SI, the magnetic flux quantum was measured with great precision by exploiting the Josephson effect. When coupled with the measurement of the von Klitzing constant R_{K} = h/e^{2}, this provided the most accurate values of the Planck constant h obtained until 2019. This may be counterintuitive, since h is generally associated with the behaviour of microscopically small systems, whereas the quantization of magnetic flux in a superconductor and the quantum Hall effect are both emergent phenomena associated with thermodynamically large numbers of particles.

As a result of the 2019 revision of the SI, the Planck constant h has a fixed value h = 6.62607015×10^{−34} J⋅Hz^{−1}, which, together with the definitions of the second and the metre, provides the official definition of the kilogram. Furthermore, the elementary charge also has a fixed value of e = 1.602176634×10^{−19} C to define the ampere. Therefore, both the Josephson constant K_{J} = 2e/h and the von Klitzing constant R_{K} = h/e^{2} have fixed values, and the Josephson effect along with the von Klitzing quantum Hall effect becomes the primary mise en pratique for the definition of the ampere and other electric units in the SI.

== Dirac magnetic flux quantum ==
The Dirac magnetic flux quantum is similar to the superconducting flux quantum, but considers a charge of $q=e$. It is named after Paul Dirac because it was implied in his publication on magnetic monopoles.

Dirac magnetic flux quantum
ISQ	CGS units
$\Phi_0 = \frac{2\pi \hbar }{q}= \frac{h }{q}$	$\Phi_0 = \frac{2\pi \hbar c}{q}= \frac{h c}{q}$

== See also ==
- Aharonov–Bohm effect
- Brian Josephson
- Committee on Data for Science and Technology
- Domain wall (magnetism)
- Flux pinning
- Ginzburg–Landau theory
- Husimi Q representation
- Macroscopic quantum phenomena
- Magnetic domain
- Magnetic monopole
- Quantum vortex
- Topological defect
- von Klitzing constant
