= Superconducting coherence length =

Characteristic length in a superconductor

In superconductivity, the superconducting coherence length, usually denoted as $\xi$ (Greek lowercase xi), is the characteristic exponent of the variations of the density of superconducting component.

The superconducting coherence length is one of two parameters in the Ginzburg–Landau theory of superconductivity. It is given by:

$$\xi = \sqrt{\frac{\hbar^2}{2 m^* |\alpha(T)|}}$$

where $\alpha(T)$ is a parameter in the Ginzburg–Landau equation for $\psi$ with the form $\alpha_0 (T-T_c)$, where $\alpha_0$ is a constant.

In Landau mean-field theory, at temperatures $T$ near the superconducting critical temperature $T_c$, $\xi (T) \propto (1-T/T_c)^{-\frac{1}{2}}$. Up to a factor of $\sqrt{2}$, it is equivalent to the characteristic exponent describing a recovery of the order parameter away from a perturbation in the theory of the second order phase transitions.

In some special limiting cases, for example in the weak-coupling BCS theory of isotropic s-wave superconductor it is related to characteristic Cooper pair size:

$$\xi_{BCS} =  \frac{\hbar v_f}{\pi \Delta}$$

where $\hbar$ is the reduced Planck constant, $m$ is the mass of a Cooper pair (twice the electron mass), $v_f$ is the Fermi velocity, and $\Delta$ is the superconducting energy gap. The superconducting coherence length is a measure of the size of a Cooper pair (distance between the two electrons) and is of the order of $10^{-4}$ cm. The electron near or at the Fermi surface moving through the lattice of a metal produces behind itself an attractive potential of range of the order of $3\times 10^{-6}$ cm, the lattice distance being of order $10^{-8}$ cm. For a very authoritative explanation based on physical intuition see the CERN article by V.F. Weisskopf.

The ratio $\kappa = \lambda/\xi$, where $\lambda$ is the London penetration depth, is known as the Ginzburg–Landau parameter. Type-I superconductors are those with $0<\kappa<1/\sqrt{2}$, and type-II superconductors are those with $\kappa>1/\sqrt{2}$.

In strong-coupling, anisotropic and multi-component theories these expressions are modified.
