= Supercurrent =

Current flowing in a superconductor without dissipation

A supercurrent is a superconducting current, that is, electric current which flows without dissipation in a superconductor. Under certain conditions, an electric current can also flow without dissipation in microscopically small non-superconducting metals. However, currents in such perfect conductors are not called supercurrents, but persistent currents.
