= Pearl vortex =

Vortex of supercurrent in a film of type-II superconductor

In superconductivity, a Pearl vortex is a vortex of supercurrent in a thin film of type-II superconductor, first described in 1964 by Judea Pearl. A Pearl vortex is similar to Abrikosov vortex except for its magnetic field profile which, due to the dominant air-metal interface, diverges sharply as 1/$r$ at short distances from the center, and decays slowly, like 1/$r^2$ at long distances. Abrikosov's vortices, in comparison, have very short range interaction and diverge as $\log(1/r)$ near the center.

== Derivation ==
In Pearl's thesis, he uses the London equations to derive the magnetic response of a thin superconducting film in the Meissner state. For a film where the thickness is on the order of the superconducting penetration depth or smaller, the ability to screen magnetic field is geometrically suppressed. Whereas in a bulk superconductor the characteristic length scale over which magnetic field can penetrate is the London penetration depth $\lambda$, in a thin film this is increased to the Pearl length $\Lambda_P = 2 \lambda^2/d$. This occurs because in a thin film, inductive coupling through free space plays a stronger role in magnetic field penetration.

This suppressed screening plays a role in film dynamics far beyond vortex dynamics. In most models, including Ginzburg-Landau theory, this can be accounted for by substituting $\Lambda_P$ instead of $\lambda$ Because the London equations assume a film in the Meissner state, Ginzburg-Landau theory is a more natural choice for studying vortex dynamics. Studying vortices in Ginzburg-Landau theory with a magnetic penetration depth of $\lambda$ yields Abrikosov vortices, while using a magnetic penetration depth of $\Lambda_P$ gives the dynamics of Pearl vortices.

== Consequences ==
Because the magnetic penetration depth of Pearl vortices is a function of both geometry and material properties, their existence implies that in sufficiently thin films the modified Ginzburg-Landau parameter $\kappa = \Lambda_P/\xi$ may become greater than $1/\sqrt{2}$ even in films with Type-I superconductor behavior in the bulk. In other words, type-I superconducting thin films can host Pearl vortices, when normally in the bulk they transition directly from the Meissner state to the normal state with applied magnetic field.

Additionally, the long interaction length of Pearl vortices enable the Berezinskii-Kosterlitz-Thouless transition (BKT) to occur in superconducting thin films. The short interaction length of Abrikosov vortices was identified as insufficient to support a BKT transition. However, Beasley, Mooij, and Orlando showed that Pearl vortices could theoretically enable a BKT transition in thin film superconductors.

== Measuring Pearl vortices ==
A transport current flowing through a superconducting film may cause these vortices to move with a constant velocity $v$ proportional to, and perpendicular to the transport current. Because of their proximity to the surface, and their sharp field divergence at their centers, Pearl's vortices can actually be seen by a scanning SQUID microscope. The characteristic length governing the distribution of the magnetic field around the vortex center is given by the ratio $\Lambda = 2 \lambda^2$/$d$, also known as "Pearl length," where $d$ is the film thickness and $\lambda$ is London penetration depth. Because this ratio can reach macroscopic dimensions (~1 mm) by making the film sufficiently thin, it can be measured relatively easy and used to estimate the density of superconducting electrons.

At distances shorter than the Pearl's length, vortices behave like a Coulomb gas (1/$r$ repulsive force).
