= Meissner effect =

Expulsion of a magnetic field from a superconductor

Diagram of the Meissner effect. Magnetic field lines, represented as arrows, are excluded from a superconductor when it is below its critical temperature.

In condensed-matter physics, the Meissner effect (or Meissner–Ochsenfeld effect) is the expulsion of a magnetic field from a superconductor during its transition to the superconducting state when it is cooled below the critical temperature. This expulsion occurs because the external magnetic field induces lossless, persistent screening currents near the material's surface, which generate an opposing magnetic field that exactly cancels the external field within the bulk. As a result, the superconductor acts as a perfect diamagnet and repels nearby magnets. The magnetic field is not completely excluded from the superconductor: it penetrates a short distance from the surface, characterized by the London penetration depth, before decaying exponentially into the interior.

The German physicists Walther Meissner and Robert Ochsenfeld discovered this phenomenon in 1933 by measuring the magnetic field distribution outside superconducting tin and lead samples. The samples, in the presence of an applied magnetic field, were cooled below their superconducting transition temperature, whereupon the samples cancelled nearly all interior magnetic fields. They detected this effect only indirectly because the magnetic flux is conserved by a superconductor: when the interior field decreases, the exterior field increases. The experiment demonstrated for the first time that superconductors were more than just perfect conductors and provided a uniquely defining property of the superconductor state.

== Explanation ==
The Meissner effect was given a phenomenological explanation by the brothers Fritz and Heinz London, who showed that the electromagnetic free energy in a superconductor is minimized provided

$$\nabla^2\mathbf{H} = \lambda^{-2} \mathbf{H}\,$$

where H is the magnetic field and λ is the London penetration depth. This equation, known as the London equation, predicts that the magnetic field in a superconductor decays exponentially from whatever value it possesses at the surface. Near the surface, within the London penetration depth, the magnetic field is not completely canceled. Each superconducting material has its own characteristic penetration depth.

In a weak applied field (less than the critical field that breaks down the superconducting phase), a superconductor expels nearly all magnetic flux by setting up electric currents near its surface, as the magnetic field H induces magnetization M within the London penetration depth from the surface. These surface currents shield the internal bulk of the superconductor from the external applied field. As the field expulsion, or cancellation, does not change with time, the currents producing this effect (called persistent currents or screening currents) do not decay with time.

Deep inside the superconductor (many penetration depths from the surface), the total magnetic field is close to zero. This means that the volume magnetic susceptibility of a superconductor is $\chi_{v} = -1$, corresponding to perfect diamagnetism. Unlike normal diamagnetism, which stems from electron orbital motion in the bulk of the material, superconducting diamagnetism arises directly from the screening currents at the surface.

== Distinction from perfect conductivity ==
Any conductor will oppose the change to magnetic flux passing through its surface due to electromagnetic induction as summarized by Lenz's law or Faraday's law. For a perfect conductor with infinite conductivity, any change in magnetic flux would be totally forbidden. However, the Meissner effect is distinct from this: when a material transitions to a superconducting state in a constant magnetic field, it actively expels magnetic flux.

If a perfect conductor is initially in zero magnetic field and a field is subsequently turned on, induced surface currents screen the field from its interior, mimicking the Meissner effect. Conversely, if a perfect conductor is initially in a non-zero magnetic field that penetrates the sample, turning off the field induces surface currents that keep the magnetic field trapped inside. This contrasts with the experimentally observed Meissner effect, where the internal field always vanishes in the absence of an applied field.

The difference is evident during field cooling, where a material is cooled into a zero-resistance state in an applied magnetic field. Initially, the field penetrates the sample. As demonstrated experimentally by the Meissner effect, a superconductor expels magnetic flux as it is cooled below its transition temperature. In contrast, a perfect conductor has no mechanism for flux expulsion, leaving the internal magnetic field frozen in place, in accordance with Faraday's law. Consequently, the magnetic state of a perfect conductor depends on its history, whereas the magnetic state of a superconductor is history-independent, representing a true thermodynamic equilibrium state. Perfect diamagnetism, alongside zero resistivity, is taken to be a defining property of the superconducting state.

The placement and subsequent levitation of a magnet above an already superconducting material does not demonstrate the Meissner effect, while an initially stationary magnet later being repelled by a superconductor as it is cooled below its critical temperature does.

== Consequences ==
The discovery of the Meissner effect led to the phenomenological theory of superconductivity by Fritz and Heinz London in 1935. This theory explained resistanceless transport and the Meissner effect, and allowed the first theoretical predictions for superconductivity to be made. However, this theory only explained experimental observations—it did not allow the microscopic origins of the superconducting properties to be identified. This was done successfully by the BCS theory in 1957, from which the penetration depth and the Meissner effect result. However, some physicists argue that BCS theory does not explain the Meissner effect.

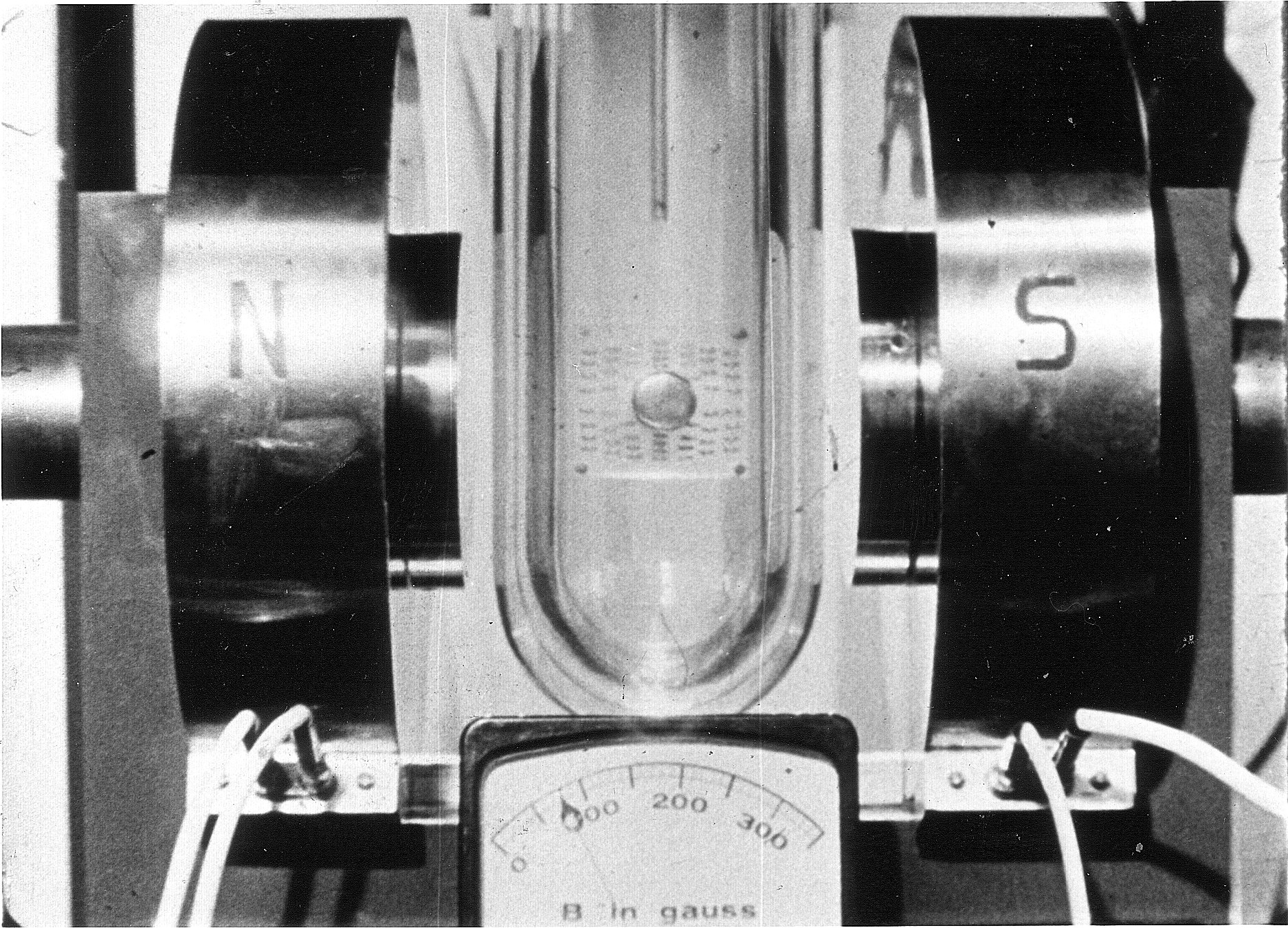
A tin cylinder—in a Dewar flask filled with liquid helium—has been placed between the poles of an electromagnet. The magnetic field is about 8 millitesla (80 G).

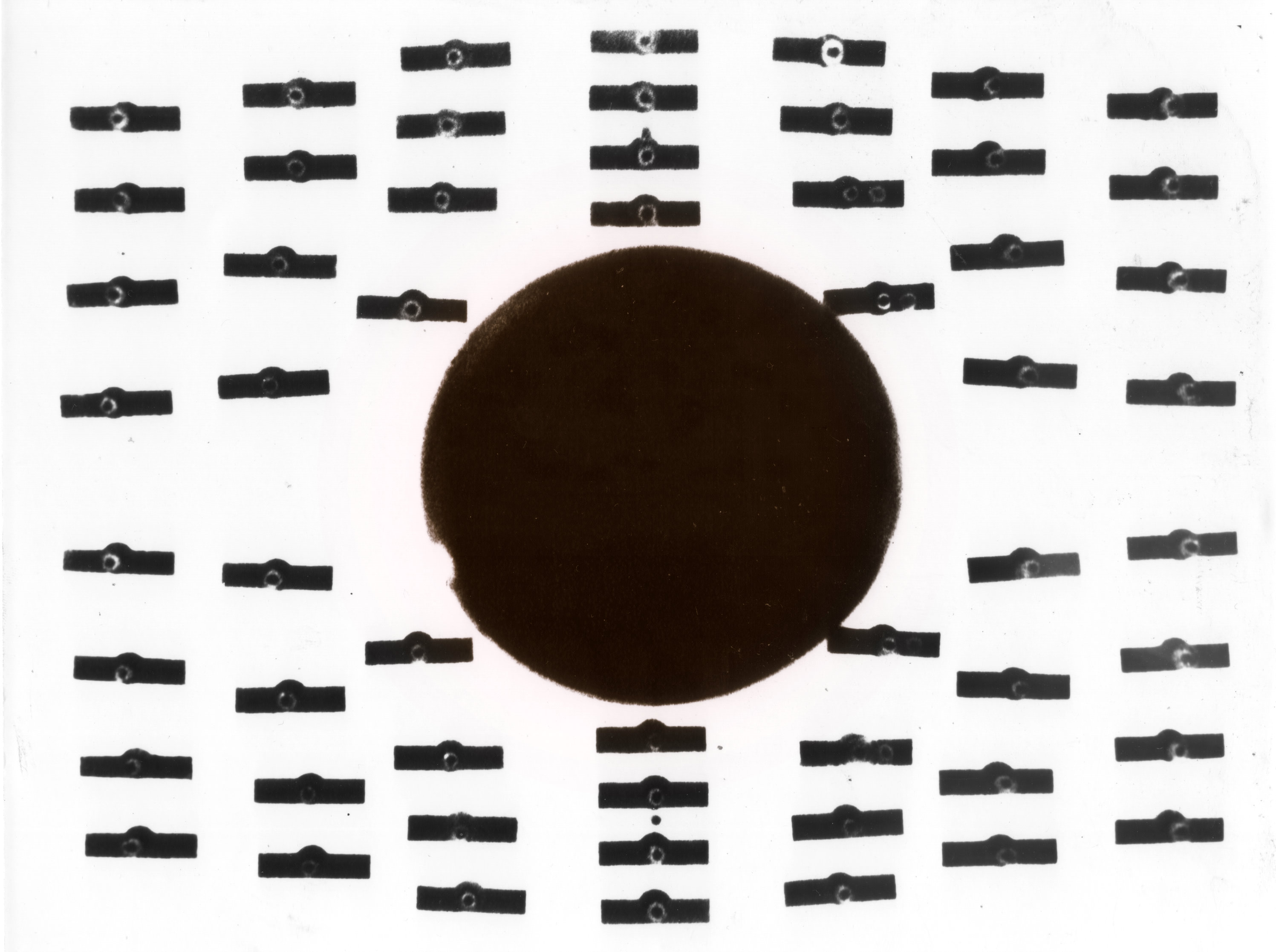
T = 4.2 K, B = 8 mT (80 G). Tin is in the normally conducting state. The compass needles indicate that magnetic flux permeates the cylinder.

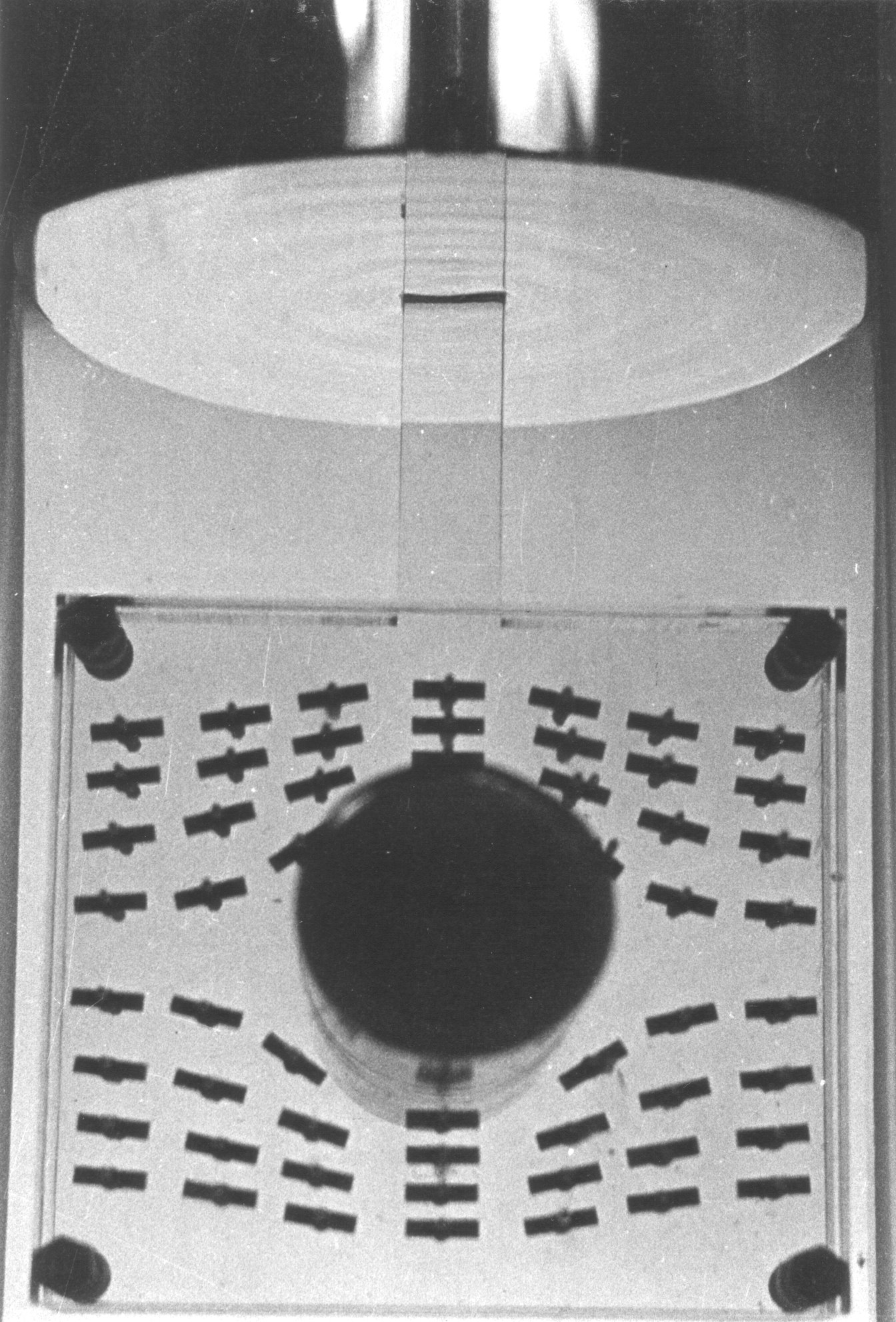
The cylinder has been cooled from 4.2 K to 1.6 K. The current in the electromagnet has been kept constant, but the tin became superconducting at about 3 K. Magnetic flux has been expelled from the cylinder (the Meissner effect).

== Paradigm for the Higgs mechanism ==
The Meissner superconductivity effect serves as an important paradigm for the generation mechanism of a mass M (i.e., a reciprocal range, $\lambda_M: = h/(M c)$ where h is the Planck constant and c is the speed of light) for a gauge field. In fact, this analogy is an abelian example for the Higgs mechanism, which generates the masses of the electroweak W^{±} and Z gauge particles in high-energy physics. The length $\lambda_M$ is identical with the London penetration depth in the theory of superconductivity.

== Bose gases ==
It is predicted that a charged Bose gas exhibits the Meissner effect.

== See also ==
- Flux pinning
- Silsbee effect
- Superfluid
