= London moment =

Effect of a rotating superconductor

The London moment (after Fritz London) is a quantum-mechanical phenomenon whereby a spinning superconductor generates a magnetic field whose axis lines up exactly with the spin axis. The term may also refer to the magnetic moment of any rotation of any superconductor, caused by the electrons lagging behind the rotation of the object, although the field strength is independent of the charge carrier density in the superconductor.

== Gravity Probe B ==
A magnetometer determines the orientation of the generated field, which is interpolated to determine the axis of rotation. Gyroscopes of this type can be extremely accurate and stable. For example, those used in the Gravity Probe B experiment measured changes in gyroscope spin axis orientation to better than 0.5 milliarcseconds (1.4×10^{−7} degrees) over a one-year period. This is equivalent to an angular separation the width of a human hair viewed from 32 kilometers (20 miles) away.

The GP-B gyro consists of a near-perfect spherical rotating mass made of fused quartz, which provides a dielectric support for a thin layer of niobium superconducting material. To eliminate friction found in conventional bearings, the rotor assembly is centered by the electric field from six electrodes. After the initial spin-up by a jet of helium which brings the rotor to 4,000 RPM, the polished gyroscope housing is evacuated to an ultra-high vacuum to further reduce drag on the rotor. Provided the suspension electronics remain powered, the extreme rotational symmetry, lack of friction, and low drag will allow the angular momentum of the rotor to keep it spinning for about 15,000 years.

A sensitive DC SQUID magnetometer able to discriminate changes as small as one quantum, or about 2×10^{−15} Wb, is used to monitor the gyroscope. A precession, or tilt, in the orientation of the rotor causes the London moment magnetic field to shift relative to the housing. The moving field passes through a superconducting pickup loop fixed to the housing, inducing a small electric current. The current produces a voltage across a shunt resistance, which is resolved to spherical coordinates by a microprocessor. The system is designed to minimize Lorentz torque on the rotor.

== Magnetic field strength ==
The magnetic field strength associated with a rotating superconductor is given by:

$$B=-\frac{2M }{Q}\ \omega ,$$

where M and Q are the mass and the charge of the superconducting charge carriers respectively. For the case of Cooper pairs of electrons, M = 2m_{e} and Q = 2e. Despite the electrons existing in a strongly interacting environment, m_{e} denotes here the mass of the bare electrons (as in vacuum), and not e.g. the effective mass of conducting electrons of the normal phase.

== Etymology ==
Named for the physical scientist Fritz London, and moment as in magnetic moment.

== See also ==
- Barnett effect
