= Cryotron =

Electrical switch that uses superconductivity

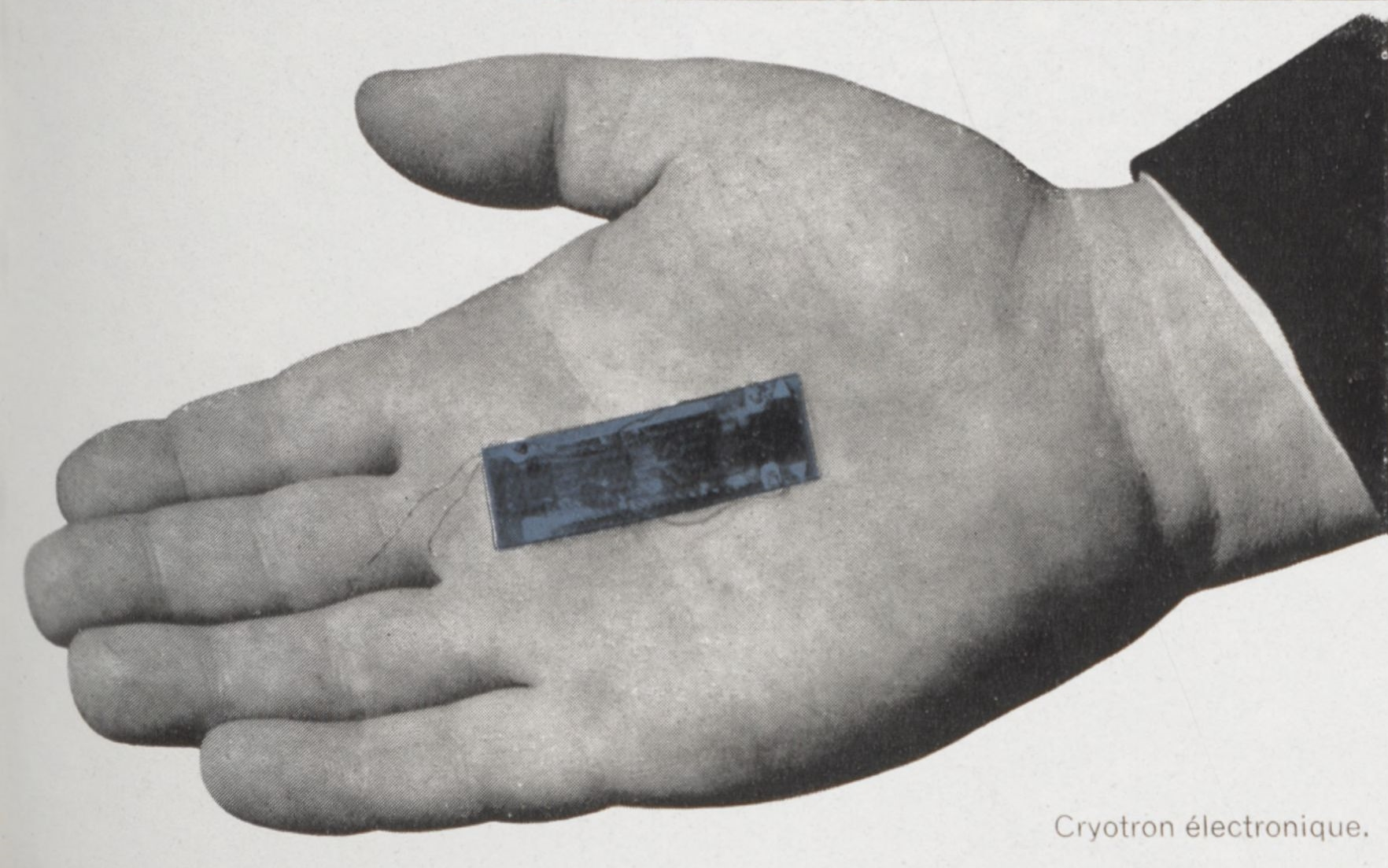
A cryotron (1959)

The cryotron is a switch that operates using superconductivity. The cryotron works on the principle that magnetic fields destroy superconductivity. This simple device consists of two superconducting wires (e.g. tantalum and niobium) with different critical temperature (T_{c}). The cryotron was invented by Dudley Allen Buck of the Massachusetts Institute of Technology Lincoln Laboratory.

== Timeline ==
- December 1953 The magnetically controlled switch is proposed in Dudley Allen Buck’s notebook.
- July 1955 Dudley A. Buck application for U.S. Patent 2,832,897 Magnetically Controlled Gating Element
- August 1955 Lincoln Laboratory Memorandum 6M-3843The Cryotron - A Superconductive Computer Component
- 1956 A Cryotron Catalog Memory System by Al Slade and Howard McMahon
- 1957 James W. Crowe application for U.S. patent 3,100,267 Superconducting Gating Devices

== Design ==
As described by Buck, a straight wire of tantalum (having lower T_{c}) is wrapped with a wire of niobium in a single-layer coil. Both wires are electrically isolated from each other. When this device is immersed in a liquid helium bath, both wires become superconducting and hence offer no resistance to the passage of electric current. Tantalum in its superconducting state can carry a large amount of current compared to its normal state. Now when current is made to pass through the niobium coil (wrapped around the tantalum), it produces a magnetic field, which in turn reduces (kills) the superconductivity of the tantalum wire and hence reduces the amount of the current that can flow through the tantalum wire. This allows control the amount of the current that can flow in the straight wire by varying the small current in the coiled wire. The tantalum straight wire can be thought of as a "gate" and the coiled niobium as a "control".

The article by Buck includes descriptions of several logic circuits implemented using cryotrons, including: one stage of a binary adder, carry network, binary accumulator stage, and two stages of a cryotron stepping register.

A planar cryotron using thin films of lead and tin was developed in 1957 by John Bremer at General Electric's General Engineering Lab in Schenectady, New York. This was one of the first integrated circuits, although using superconductors rather than semiconductors. In the next few years, a demonstration computer was made and arrays with 2000 devices operated. A short history of this work is in the November 2007 newsletter of the IEEE History Center.

Juri Matisoo developed a version of the cryotron incorporating a Josephson junction switched by the magnetic field from a control wire. He also explained the shortcomings of traditional cryotrons in which the superconductive material must transition between superconducting and normal states to switch the device, and thus switch relatively slowly. Matisoo's cryotron switched between a conducting state in which "pair tunneling" of electrons through the gate took place and a "resistive" state where only single electrons were able to tunnel. The circuit was (like the traditional cryotron) capable of some amplification (i.e gain greater than unity) and had a switching rate of less than 800 picoseconds. Although the requirement for cryogenic cooling limited its practicality, it wasn't until the late 2010s that commercial transistors came close to matching this performance.

There have been periods of renewed interest in various types of cryotron. IBM experimented with using them for limited applications in supercomputers during the 1980s, and (as of 2020) there has been some investigation of their potential applications both to I/O and logic in prototype quantum computers.

== Legacy ==
The Cryotron brought Buck a number of interviews with various news agencies at the time, international scientific renown, and while the work didn't survive Buck's death, many of the techniques for the research of the device would be used at Intel and other chip manufacturers and in the research of other more modern and interactive computers, especially at MIT.
