= Kenneth R. Shoulders =

American experimental physicist (1927–2013)

Kenneth Radford Shoulders (March 7, 1927 – June 7, 2013) was an experimental physicist. He is known for various work related to the field of energy and has also been credited as an early pioneer of electron beam lithography, which has become a key mask-making technology for modern microelectronics. He has additionally been attributed the title, ‘Father of Vacuum of Microelectronics’ and been known as a founder of microelectronic field emission devices.

== Career ==
In the 1950s, Shoulders worked as a researcher at MIT in applied research on microminiature data-processing components and systems, and worked with Dudley Allen Buck in making thin-film cryotron integrated circuits. In 1958, he moved to California to work as a Senior Research Engineer, Applied Physics Laboratory created by Charles Rosen at Stanford Research Institute (SRI). Shoulders established SRI’s microelectronics program. Early in his career at SRI, Shoulders made the first 12 quadrupole mass spectrometers and then later worked with others such as mouse inventor, Douglas Engelbart and Jerre Noe.

During his time at SRI, Shoulders also worked on ideas for a flying car, the Gyrodyne Convertiplane. It combined the features of a car, a helicopter (a rotor on the roof for take-off and landing) and a small airplane (rigid wings and a rear propeller). Shoulders developed preliminary sketches and specifications, promoting the idea of a ground-to-air vehicle that could rescue long-distance commuters from hours of grid-lock traffic. In 1963, Shoulders asked the California State Senate’s Transportation Committee for permission to use his invention on public roads, and in 1964 they agreed. However, a number of nearby municipalities banned the Convertiplane from their airspace.

Unable to commercialize the flying car, Shoulders created his own company, Vertitek, and began developing remote-controlled drones. He imagined a wide variety of drone applications, from children's toys to agricultural crop dusters. One example, the Boomerang, sent out sound waves to detect and avoid collisions, and looked like giant maple seed.

In the 1980s, Shoulders moved to Austin, Texas to work at Jupiter Technologies as Chief Inventor and focusing on electron condensed charge technology (referred to as EV's) along with Harold E. Puthoff.

In 2000, Shoulders' work related to high energy electron charge clusters was incorporated into a Future Energy Technologies briefing presented to The U.S. Senate Environment and Public Works Committee.

== Selected bibliography ==
- D.A. Buck and K.R. Shoulders, An approach to microminiature systems, in Proceedings of the Eastern Joint Computer Conference, Amer. Inst. of Elect. Engrs.: New York, 1958, p. 55-59.
- K.R. Shoulders, "Microelectronics Using Electron Beam Activated Machining Techniques," in Franz L. Alt, ed., Advances in Computers, vol 2 (New York: Academic Press, 1961), pp. 135–293. ASIN: B0007HV7DK
- K.R. Shoulders, "Toward Complex Systems", from Symposium on Microelectronics and Large Systems, Nov. 17 and 18, 1964, Washington, D.C., Mathis, S. J., Wiley, R. E. and Spandorfer, L. M., editors, Spartan Books and MacMillan, 1965, pp. 97–128.
- C.A. Spindt and K.R. Shoulders, Research in micron-size Field-emission tubes, in IEEE Conference Record, 1966 Eight Conference on Tube Techniques, 1966, p. 143.
- K. R. Shoulders, EV—A Tale of Discovery, Austin, TX, 1987. A historical sketch of early EV work having: 246 pages, 153 photos and drawings, 13 references.

US Patents:

- 3,497,929, "Method of making a needle-type electron source" (with Louis N. Heynick), 1970
- 3,398,317, "Information storage tube", 1968
- 3,430,213, "Data Storage and Logic Device", 1969
- 3,453,478, "Needle-Type Electron Source" (with Louis N. Heynick), 1969
- 3,458,745, "Thin Wafer-Channel Multiplier", 1969
- 3,500,102, "Thin Electron Tube With Electron Emitters at Intersections of Crossed Conductors" (with Munsey E. Crost and Mortimer H. Zinn), 1970
- 3,500,112 "Electron Device With Improved Secondary Electron Collection Means", 1970 (with, Kendal T. Rogers and John Kelly)
- 3,533,429, "Pneumatically Operated Valve", 1970
- 3,755,704, "Field Emission Cathode Structures and Devices Utilizing Such Structures" (with Charles A. Spindt and Louis N. Heynick), 1973
- 3,789,471, "Field Emission Cathode Structures, Devices Utilizing Such Structures, and Methods of Producing Such Structures" (with Charles A. Spindt and Louis N. Heynick), 1974
- 3,915,414 "Rotating aircraft and aircraft control system", 1975
- 3,969,039 "Vacuum pump", 1974
- 5,018,180 "Energy conversion using high charge density", 1991
- 5,054,046 "Method of and apparatus for production and manipulation of high density charge", 1991
- 5,054,047 "Circuits responsive to and controlling charged particles", 1991
- 5,123,039, "Energy conversion using high charge density", 1992
- 5,148,461, "Circuits responsive to and controlling charged particles", 1992
- 5,153,901, "Production and manipulation of charged particles", 1992
