= Hydrogen cryomagnetics =

Use of cryogenic liquid hydrogen to cool an electromagnet

Hydrogen cryomagnetics is a term used to denote the use of cryogenic liquid hydrogen to cool the windings of an electromagnet. A key benefit of hydrogen cryomagnetics is that low temperature liquid hydrogen can be deployed simultaneously both as a cryogen to cool electromagnet windings and as an energy carrier . That is, powerful synergistic benefits are likely to arise when hydrogen is used as a fuel and as a coolant. Even without the fuel/coolant synergies, hydrogen cryomagnetics is an attractive option for the cooling of superconducting electromagnets as it eliminates dependence upon increasingly scarce and expensive liquid helium. For hydrogen cryomagnetic applications specialist hydrogen-cooled electromagnets are wound using either copper or superconductors. Liquid-hydrogen-cooled copper-wound magnets work well as pulsed field magnets. Superconductors have the property that they can operate continuously and very efficiently as electrical resistive losses are almost entirely avoided. Most commonly the term "hydrogen cryomagnetics" is used to denote the use of cryogenic liquid hydrogen directly, or indirectly, to enable high temperature superconductivity in electromagnet windings.

Hydrogen cryomagnetics is especially useful where high magnetic fields are required, such as in high torque electric motors. At standard atmospheric pressure liquid hydrogen boils at approximately 20.3 K (-259.3 °C). Liquid hydrogen at such a temperature is significantly colder than the temperatures at which superconductivity can first be induced in a range of important high temperature superconductors including yttrium barium copper oxide (YBCO), because YBCO has a superconducting transition temperature (Tc) of 93 K. The operation of YBCO-based superconducting magnets at a temperature more than 70 K below Tc allows for the use of very high current densities and very high magnetic fields without loss of superconductivity. The materials properties of YBCO are such that it cannot be made into ductile wires although much progress has been made towards high field YBCO electromagnets based on the use of tapes rather than wires. Another superconductor suitable for hydrogen cryomagnetic use is magnesium diboride. Magnesium diboride is a conventional superconductor and it can be prepared in flexible wires facilitating its potential application in, for example, tokamak fusion reactors. Magnesium diboride has a transition temperature of 39 K. While at atmospheric pressure liquid hydrogen is cold enough to cool magnesium diboride into the superconducting state, there are advantages to pumping on the hydrogen so as to lower its temperature still further when in use such a magnet winding (this uses the same physics that says that the boiling point of water can be reduced by reducing the pressure above the liquid, see e.g.). Generally the greater the difference between conductor temperature and superconducting transition temperature the better. Liquid hydrogen is not the only way cryogenically to cool a magnet, indeed conventionally superconductors are cooled using liquid helium at 4.2K and for conventional conductor pulsed magnets (including copper) most attention has been given to liquid nitrogen at 77 K. Liquid hydrogen can be expected to drive better performance than liquid nitrogen and, as discussed below, liquid hydrogen avoids several concerns around helium availability.

Any use of hydrogen cryomagnetics requires careful consideration of hydrogen safety.

Hydrogen cryomagnetics is concept distinct from the use of higher temperature gaseous hydrogen as a coolant in power plant turbines.

== Origins ==
The term hydrogen cryomagnetics was first used in a text panel forming part of an article by Professor WJ Nuttall and Professor BA Glowacki published in July 2008 in Nuclear Engineering International. The concept was returned to in an Institute of Physics conference held in Manchester England in April 2010. The presentation was delivered by Professor WJ Nuttall and co-authored by Professor BA Glowacki and Dr L Bromberg. The journey to the term also involved thinking around Hydrogen as a Fuel and as a Coolant – from the superconductivity perspective. Earlier related consideration of liquid hydrogen as a cryogenic coolant includes work by Glowacki and co-authors from 2005 and 2006. The concept of hydrogen cryomagnetics has been further elaborated and discussed in 2012, 2015 and 2019.

== Attributes ==
The emergence of hydrogen cryomagnetics can be expected to benefit from the development of strong industrial interest in liquid hydrogen that can be expected to occur for other reasons, including the growth of a general hydrogen economy and the need to transport and store bulk hydrogen. Global interest is growing in the emergence of a hydrogen economy in which hydrogen is a low-carbon energy carrier sourced from renewables (green hydrogen) or alternatively from natural gas with carbon capture and storage (this is sometimes termed "blue hydrogen"). When pipelines are unavailable. the use of liquefied hydrogen for the bulk transport and distribution of hydrogen molecules has been found to be the more efficient than high pressure gas cylinders when moving the large quantities over the large distances. Hydrogen (as liquid or gas) is an energy storage system in competition with electric battery technology. Hydrogen wins out over batteries for the largest quantitites of energy stored over the longest period. Hydrogen fuel cells are win out over battery electric technologies for the heaviest forms of transportation - such as trains, trucks and buses Hydrogen technology is in competition with battery technology and gaseous hydrogen technology is in competition with liquid hydrogen technology. As these competitive forces pay out it is quite possible that a significant role will emerge for liquid hydrogen as a stationary long-term and large-scale energy storage system and fuelling system for heavier vehicles. In such scenarios, the emerging economic role of liquid hydrogen production and distribution can be expected to greatly favour the subsequent use of hydrogen in cryomagnetic applications.

=== Avoiding the problems of helium ===
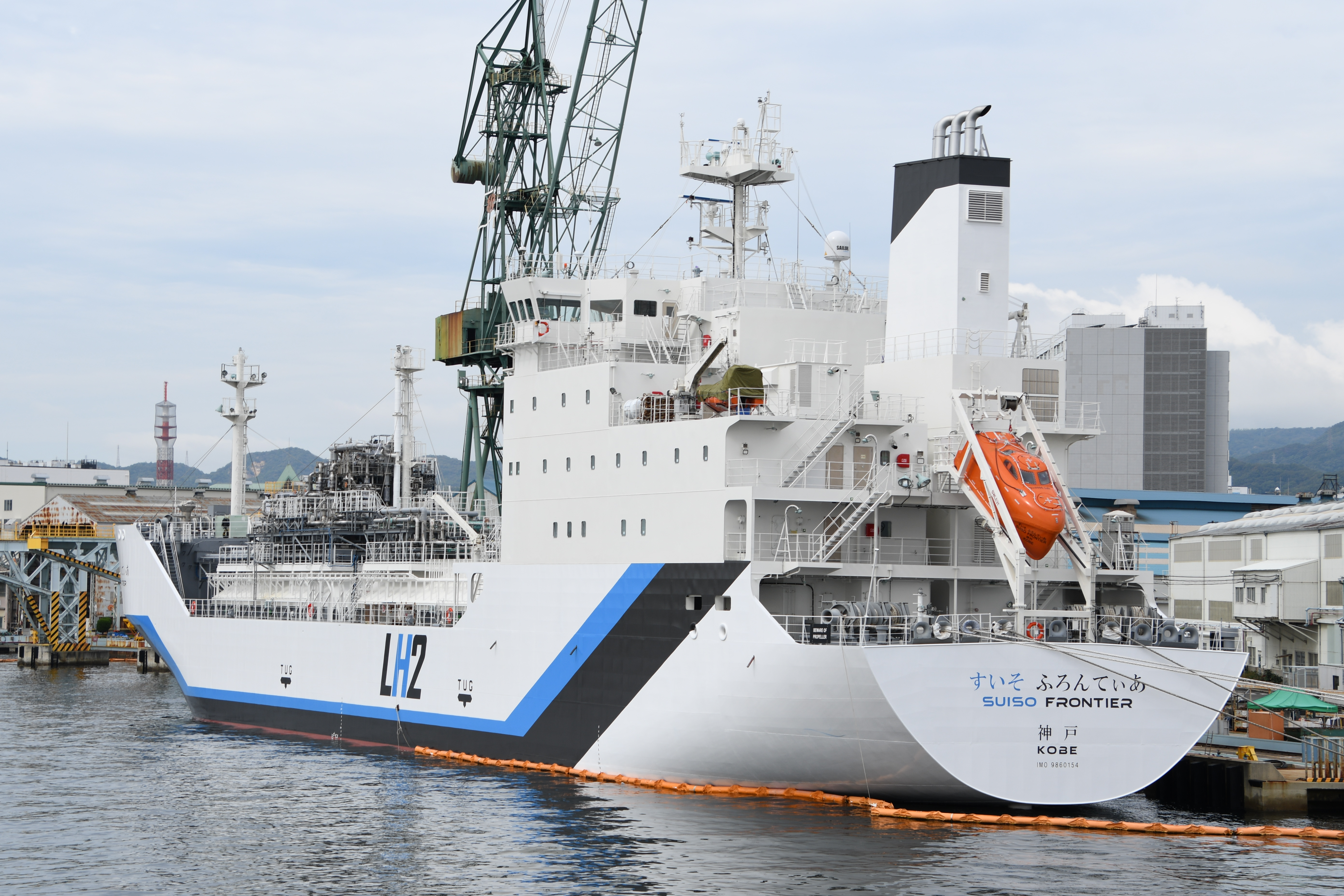
Japanese prototype liquid hydrogen carrier Suiso Frontier, Kobe, Japan, October 2020.

The conventional way to cool superconducting magnets is to use liquid helium (atmospheric pressure boiling point 4.2K). Helium is a byproduct of the current natural gas industry and its fluctuating price and availability have been a cause of much concern in recent years. Improved efficiency of use, and the avoidance of waste, can be expected to stretch helium supplies. Further natural gas sourced helium cannot necessarily be expected to continue if natural gas is to be phased out on a journey to Net-Zero. There is a need for those helium using sectors that can substitute away from helium to do so. Those users that could safely switch to hydrogen cryomagnetics could see a significant reduction in operating costs and avoid risks associated with helium supply scarcity.

=== Better electric motors ===
In the twentieth century the dominant type of electric motor was an induction motor using tightly wound copper wire coils to generate the necessary internal magnetic fields. More recently, and in part spurred on by the growth in battery electric vehicles, there has been much innovation in permanent magnet motors. These rely on high field permanent magnets relying on rare earth minerals. Hydrogen cryomagnetics provides for the possibility of superconducting induction motors cooled by liquid hydrogen at approximately 20K. Such cryogenic liquid might be available on a vehicle (such as an airplane, train, truck, bus or even car) if high purity hydrogen is used for on-board fuel cell electricity generation.

=== Liquid hydrogen - a source of high purity hydrogen ===
The boil off gas from a tank of liquid hydrogen can be expected to be extremely pure and clean. In a sense the liquid hydrogen has been distilled. Extended operation of Fuel Cell Electric Vehicles, for example, relies on the need to protect fuel cell membranes and catalysts from contamination. Fuel cell degradation in use can have many causes, but nevertheless fuel purity (in normal conditions and in the case of refuelling equipment failure) can be expected to be a major concern for any system relying on high pressure hydrogen gas handling.

== Potential applications ==
Various potential applications of hydrogen cryomagnetics have been reviewed by Mojarrad and co-workers in 2022. Some potential applications are listed below.

Fusion energy

The concept of applied hydrogen cryomagnetics first emerged in connection with magnetically confined nuclear fusion. WJ Nuttall had proposed in 2004 that the commercialisation of fusion energy might be via the international oil companies rather than via electricity. For technical and economic reasons fusion energy might be a viable means to produce liquid hydrogen for the hydrogen economy in ways reminiscent of today's liquefied natural gas economy. Conventional tokamak fusion is likely to require very large amounts of expensive and scarce liquid helium to cool superconducting magnets. Liquid helium is a key consumable in the conventional paradigm. Noting the potential abundance of liquid hydrogen at a future fusion facility owned by one of today's international oil companies it would seem natural to use the cryogenic hydrogen to help break the dependence on helium. Hydrogen cryomagnetics has the potential to facilitate tokamak fusion energy. These ideas came together as a concept known as 'Fusion Island' developed by WJ Nuttall, BA Glowacki and RH Clarke. The Fusion Island concept was outlined further in 2008 and 2021. Commonwealth Fusion Systems in Massachusetts is actively exploring superconducting magnet technologies cooled to liquid hydrogen temperatures.

Aviation

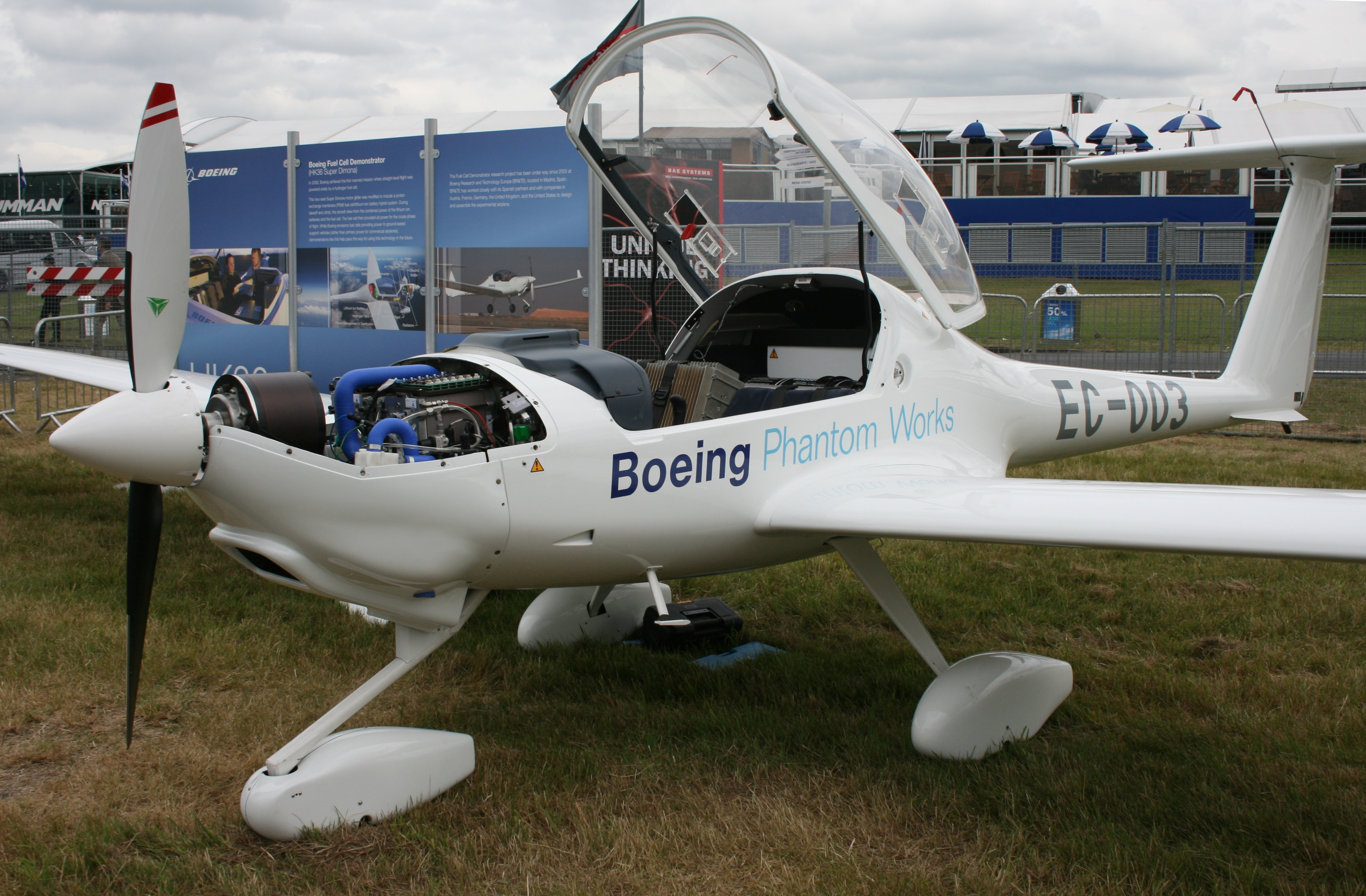
Boeing hydrogen fuel cell aircraft demonstrator in 2008

Another significant opportunity for hydrogen cryomagnetics lies in low CO_{2} emissions aviation. Airbus, Rolls-Royce and collaborators have been pioneering the use of liquid hydrogen in aircraft propulsion. Writing in Aviation Week in April 2021, Thierry Dubois observed: "Airbus has launched an ambitious demonstration program for the use of superconducting technology. It is aiming at a major efficiency improvement. The idea stems from both the difficulty of designing an electric-propulsion architecture with conventional wiring and the opportunity to use liquid hydrogen as a cold source. Superconducting materials require cryogenic temperatures." Hydrogen cryomagnetics permits the on aircraft use of hydrogen fuel cell technology to generate electricity to drive high torque HTS based electric motors capable of driving propellers or ducted fans at high efficiency. The Advanced Superconducting Motor Experimental Demonstrator (ASuMED) programme funded by the European Union, is working on a 99% efficient superconducting aircraft engine with a power-to-weight ratio of 20 kW/kg. Researchers at Moscow Aviation Institute have proposed a design for a 5MW hydrogen cryomagnetic aero engine. Even before the benefits to be obtained from the use hydrogen cryomagnetic superconducting induction motors hydrogen is attracting much interest as a low emission aviation fuel of the future. Airbus has an active hydrogen program as do other major industrial concerns in global aviation.

Metals processing industry

Hydrogen cryomagnetics has potentially beneficial synergistic links with the emerging low emission steel industry as being pioneered by SSAB in Sweden. Hydrogen is being developed as an alternative to coking coal for the reduction of iron ores to produce pig iron ('smelting'). The use of hydrogen for such purposes would greatly strengthen links between hydrogen and steel making. With that in mind, if a forge were to have access to cryogenic liquid hydrogen then large scale magnetic induction forging based upon hydrogen cryomagnetic technology could be extremely economically attractive, especially for billet heating.
