= Heinz London =

German physicist

- Born: 7 November 1907
- Died: 3 August 1970 (aged 62)
- Known for: London equations London penetration depth Anomalous skin effect Dilution refrigerator
- Spouses: Gertrude Rosenthal (m. 1939, divorced) Lucie Meissner (m. 1946, survived)
- Children: 4
- Awards: Simon Memorial Prize (1959); Fellow of the Royal Society (1961)
- Scientific career
- Institutions: University of Bristol; University of Oxford; Clarendon Laboratory

Heinz London (7 November 1907 – 3 August 1970) was a German-British physicist. Together with his brother Fritz London he was a pioneer in the field of superconductivity. London equations are named after the two brothers.

== Biography ==
London was born in Bonn, Germany, in a liberal Jewish-German family. His father, Franz London, was professor of mathematics at the University of Bonn and his mother, Luise Burger, was the daughter of a prosperous textile manufacturer. His father died of heart failure when Heinz was nine years old. The greatest influence on Heinz's childhood was his older brother Fritz. Throughout their lives the two brothers maintained a close relationship.

Heinz followed in his older brother's footsteps, studying physics, but became an experimental physicist instead and obtained his PhD under the famous superconductivity physicist Francis Simon.

This connection also gave Heinz the opportunity to leave Nazi Germany. Frederick Lindemann invited Francis Simon to join the Clarendon Laboratory at the University of Oxford in 1933 supported by money obtained from chemical company ICI. When Francis Simon did he brought Heinz London as his assistant as well as Nicholas Kurti.

While working in Oxford, Heinz shared a rented house with his brother Fritz and sister-in-law Edith where together the brothers developed the London equations.

By 1936, the money that had funded the refugee scientists had dried up and Lindemann could not find funds to offer positions to them and many others. Heinz was in a junior position without any expectation of remaining at Oxford, and so took an appointment at the University of Bristol. Fritz held out for a position at Oxford which never came and later accepted an offer by the Henri Poincaré Institute in Paris. After the outbreak of World War II, in September 1939, he moved to Duke University.

In 1940, Heinz was declared a civilian enemy alien and interned on the Isle of Man, but was then released to co-operate with the British nuclear program. In 1942, he obtained British citizenship.

In 1946, Heinz married Lucie Meissner. They had four children, Louise, Norah, Martin and Fred.

From 1946 until his death, Heinz worked at the Atomic Energy Research Establishment at Harwell.

Heinz was a lifelong heavy smoker and died from lung cancer in 1970. He was an atheist.

== Education ==
London studied at multiple institutions as was customary at the time in Germany. He was at the University of Bonn in 1926/27. After that he interned for six months at a chemical plant for Heraeus in Hanau, Germany. In 1929, he spent a year of study at the Technische Hochschule Charlottenburg and then he was at the Ludwig-Maximilians-Universität München until 1931. In late 1933, he obtained his PhD under the low temperature physicist Franz Simon at the University of Breslau, with a thesis "on the possibility of the occurrence of high frequency residual resistance in superconductors".

== Career ==
London worked with his brother Fritz London on superconductivity, discovering the London equations when working at the University of Oxford, in the Clarendon Laboratory.

These equations gave a first explanation to the Meissner effect (and, so, to the properties of superconductors). He is known as well for being the inventor of the dilution refrigerator, a cryogenic device that uses liquid helium.

== Honours and awards ==
London was elected a Fellow of the Royal Society in 1961, and his nomination read

Populated the finite depth to which a magnetic field penetrates into a superconductor. Suggested and first carried out an experiment (high frequency dissipation) proving the existence of this effect. The concept of the "depth of penetration" has initiated a great number of experiments and has also led to the development (by H. London together with his brother F. London) of the electrodynamics of superconductivity.

First considered the relation of size and critical field in superconductors, introducing the concept of surface energy. Postulated the increase of the critical field with decreasing size on a thermodynamical basis and demonstrated the existence of a striking effect of this kind by direct experiment (with Appleyard and others). Investigated experimentally the question of the existence of an electric field in a superconductor. Applied thermodynamics to the thermo-mechanical effect in liquid helium II and derived a relation (which now bears his name) between entropy, temperature and thermo-mechanical pressure which has since been verified experimentally and which has been of great value to the understanding of the helium II problem.

Has developed a new method for the separation of O-13 and O-18 isotopes by the distillation of carbon monoxide. Has recently published work on the differences in the molecular volume of isotopes.
