= Silsbee effect =

Critical current at which a superconductor loses its superconductivity

The Silsbee effect or Silsbee current refers to the effect by which, if the electric current through a superconductor exceeds a critical level, the superconducting state will be destroyed. The size of the critical current (which can be as large as 100 amperes in a 1-mm wire) depends on the nature and geometry of the specimen and is related to whether the magnetic field produced by the current exceeds the critical field at the surface of the superconductor.

The effect is named after Francis B. Silsbee who studied conductivity at low temperatures.
