= Dudley Allen Buck =

American electrical engineer (1927–1959)

Dr. Dudley Allen Buck
- Born: April 25, 1927; San Francisco, California
- Died: May 21, 1959 (aged 32)
- Monuments: Bronze Plaque – Wilmington, Massachusetts, High School
- Education: B.S.E.E., Sc.D.
- Alma mater: University of Washington, George Washington University, Massachusetts Institute of Technology
- Employer(s): U.S. Navy Communications Supplemental Activities – Washington, Armed Forces Security Agency, National Security Agency, Massachusetts Institute of Technology
- Known for: Cryotron
- Awards: Browder J. Thompson Award

(Dr.) Dudley Allen Buck (1927–1959) was an electrical engineer and inventor of components for high-speed computing devices in the 1950s. He is best known for the invention of the cryotron, a superconductive computer component that is operated in liquid helium at a temperature near absolute zero. Other inventions were ferroelectric memory, content-addressable memory, non-destructive sensing of magnetic fields, and writing printed circuits with a beam of electrons.

== Early life ==
Dudley A. Buck was born in San Francisco, California on April 25, 1927. Dudley and his siblings moved to Santa Barbara, California, in 1940. In 1943, Dudley Buck earned his amateur radio license W6WCK and a First Class Radiotelephone Operator license for commercial work. He worked part-time at Santa Barbara radio station KTMS until he left to attend college at the University of Washington under the U.S. Navy V-12 program.

After graduating from the University of Washington in 1947, Buck served in the U.S. Navy for two years at Nebraska Avenue in Washington, D.C. where he began doing work and scientific advising for the agency that would later become the National Security Agency. He entered the reserves in 1950 and then began his career at Massachusetts Institute of Technology.

== Career ==
Buck began as a research assistant while a graduate student at MIT in 1950. His first assignment was on the I/O systems of the Whirlwind computer. He was assigned to work with another graduate student, William N. Papian, who in the Fall of 1949 Jay Forrester had "selected.. to work testing individual cores by the dozen .. and to pick out cores exhibiting exceptionally good properties.". Subsequently, they worked with various manufacturers developing the ferrite materials to be used in coincident-current magnetic core memory.

In late 1951, Dudley Buck proposed computer circuits that used neither vacuum tubes, nor the recently invented transistor. It is possible to make all computer logic circuits, including shift registers, counters, and accumulators using only magnetic cores, wire and diodes. Magnetic logic was used in the KW-26 cryptographic communications system, and in the BOGART computer.

FeRAM was first built by Buck as part of his thesis work in 1952. In addition to its use as computer memory, ferroelectric materials can be used to build shift registers, logic, and amplifiers. Buck showed that a ferroelectric switch could be useful to perform memory addressing.

Buck completed his S.M degree in 1952. His thesis for the degree was Ferroelectrics for Digital Information Storage and Switching. The thesis was supervised by Arthur R. von Hippel. In this work he demonstrated the principles of storing data in ferroelectric materials; the earliest demonstration of Ferroelectric memory, or FeRAM. This work also demonstrated that ferroelectric materials could be used as voltage controlled switches to address memory, whereas close friend and fellow student Ken Olsen's saturable switch used ferrites and was a current operated switch.

The basic idea for the cryotron was entered into his MIT notebook on December 15, 1953. By 1955, Buck was building practical cryotron devices with niobium and tantalum. The cryotron was a great breakthrough in the size of electronic computer elements. In the next decade, cryotron research at other laboratories resulted in the invention of the Crowe Cell at IBM, the Josephson Junction, and the SQUID. Those inventions have today made possible the mapping of brain activity by magnetoencephalography. Despite the need for liquid helium, cryotrons were expected to make computers so small, that in 1956, Life Magazine displayed a full-page photograph of Dudley Buck with a cryotron in one hand and a vacuum tube in the other.

Dr. Buck earned a Doctor of Science from M.I.T. in 1958, and would go on to become a professor.

By 1957, Buck began to place more emphasis on miniaturization of cryotron systems. The speed that cryotron devices could attain is greater as size of the device is reduced. Dr. Buck, his students, and researcher Kenneth R. Shoulders made great progress manufacturing thin-film cryotron integrated circuits in the laboratory at MIT. Developments included the creation of oxide layers as insulation and for mechanical strength by electron beam reduction of chemicals. This work, co-authored with Kenneth Shoulders, was published as "An Approach to Microminiature Printed Systems". It was presented in December, 1958, at the Eastern Joint Computer Conference in Philadelphia. Per a request by chairman Dr. Louis Ridenour, Solomon Kullback appointed Buck to the National Security Agency Scientific Advisory Board Panel on Electronics and Data Processing that same month.

Another key invention by Dr. Buck was a method of non-destructive sensing of magnetic materials. In the process of reading data from a typical magnetic core memory, the contents of the memory are erased, making it necessary to take additional time to re-write the data back into the magnetic storage. By design of 'quadrature sensing' of magnetic fields, the state of magnetism of the core may be read without alteration, thus eliminating the extra time required to re-write memory data.

Dudley Buck invented recognition unit memory. Also called content-addressable memory, it is a technique of storing and retrieving data in which there is no need to know the location of that data. Not only is there no need to query an index for the location of data, the inquiry for data is broadcast to all memory elements simultaneously; thus data retrieval time is independent of the size of the database.

== Awards ==
In 1957, the Institute of Radio Engineers awarded Dudley Buck the Browder J. Thompson award for engineers under the age of 30.

== Death and legacy ==
Buck died suddenly May 21, 1959, just weeks after his 32nd birthday. His close associate Louis Ridenour died the same day. Their deaths have been the subject of some speculation, with some claiming that Buck and Ridenour's deaths were related. However, Buck's son, Douglas Buck, noted there is no evidence to support such claims, so speculation on Buck's death remains based on circumstantial evidence. His biography was published in October 2018, The Cryotron Files by Iain Dey and his son Douglas Buck.

=== Publications ===
- 1951, Binary Counting with Magnetic Cores
- 1952, Ferroelectrics for Digital Information Storage and Switching
- 1952, Magnetic and Dielectric Amplifiers
- 1958, An Approach to Microminiature Printed Systems
- 1962, Switching Circuits – chapter 13 in Computer Handbook by Harry Huskey

=== US Patents ===
- 2,832,897 – Magnetically Controlled Gating Element
- 2,933,618 – Saturable Switch
- 2,936,435 – High-Speed Cryotron
- 2,959,688 – Multiple Gate Cryotron Switch
- 2,987,707 – Magnetic Data Conversion Apparatus
- 3,001,178 – Electrical Memory Circuits
- 3,011,711 – Cryogenic Computing Devices
- 3,019,978 – Cryotron Translator
