= Superconductivity =

Electrical conductivity with exactly zero resistance

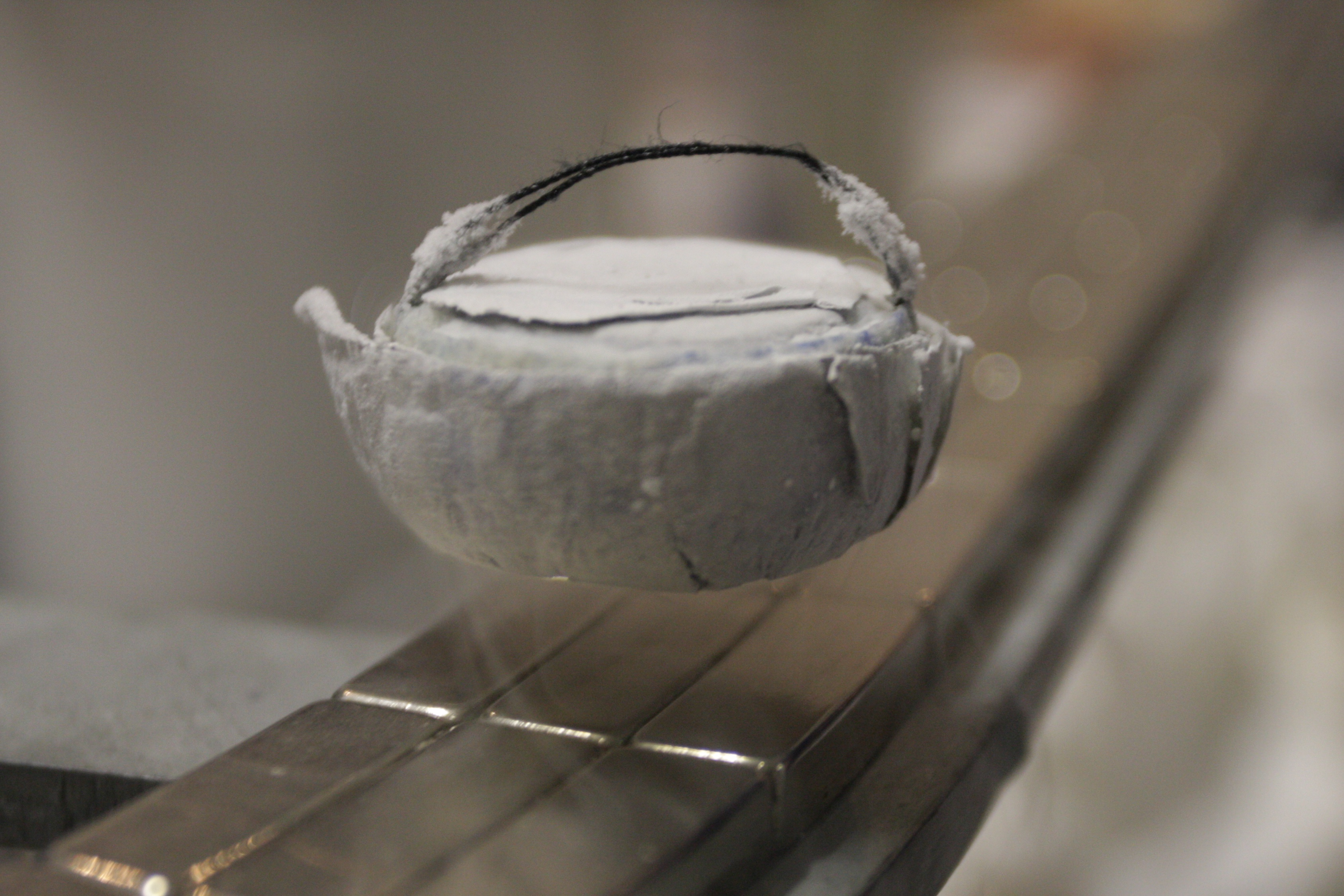
A high-temperature superconductor levitating above a magnet. A persistent electric current flows on the surface of the superconductor, acting to exclude the magnetic field of the magnet (Meissner effect). This current effectively forms an electromagnet that repels the magnet.

Superconductivity is a set of physical properties observed in superconductors: materials where electrical resistance is exactly zero and magnetic fields are expelled from the material. Unlike an ordinary metallic conductor, whose resistance decreases gradually as its temperature is lowered, even down to near absolute zero, a superconductor has a characteristic critical temperature below which the resistance drops abruptly to zero. An electric current through a loop of superconducting wire can persist indefinitely with no power source.

The superconductivity phenomenon was discovered in 1911 by Dutch physicist Heike Kamerlingh Onnes. Like ferromagnetism and atomic spectral lines, superconductivity is a phenomenon which can only be explained by quantum mechanics. It is characterized by the Meissner effect, the complete cancellation of the magnetic field in the interior of the superconductor during its transitions into the superconducting state. The occurrence of the Meissner effect indicates that superconductivity cannot be understood simply as the idealization of perfect conductivity in classical physics.

In 1986, it was discovered that some cuprate-perovskite ceramic materials have a critical temperature above 35 K (−238 °C). It was found shortly thereafter (by Ching-Wu Chu) that replacing the lanthanum with yttrium, i.e. making YBCO, raised the critical temperature to 92 K (−181 °C), which was important because liquid nitrogen could then be used as a refrigerant. Such a high transition temperature is theoretically impossible for a conventional superconductor, leading the materials to be termed high-temperature superconductors. The cheaply available coolant liquid nitrogen boils at 77 K (−196 °C) and thus the existence of superconductivity at higher temperatures than this facilitates many experiments and applications that are less practical at lower temperatures.

== History ==
Lord Kelvin had argued, using the law of corresponding states, that the resistivity of all substances diverges at sufficiently low temperatures. This argument influenced Onnes to investigate the low temperature limit of resistivity. Onnes result would later go onto prove Kelvin incorrect.

Timeline of superconducting materials, note the cuts in both axis scales. Colors represent different classes of materials: BCS (dark green circle); Superhydride BCS (green circle); Cuprate (blue diamond); Iron-pnictogen-based (yellow square); Heavy-fermions-based (light green star); Organic superconductor (light purple inverted triangle); Buckminsterfullerene-based (purple inverted triangle); Allotropes of carbon (red triangle); Nickel-based (pink six-point star); Kagome superconductor (blue rotated diamond); Strontium ruthenate (grey pentagon); *NdSrNiO should read Sr_{0.2}Nd_{0.8}NiO_{2}

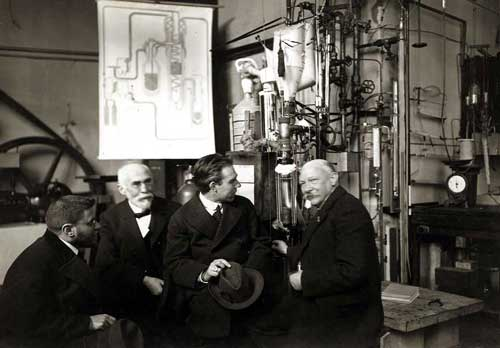
Heike Kamerlingh Onnes (right), the discoverer of superconductivity. Paul Ehrenfest, Hendrik Lorentz, Niels Bohr stand to his left.

Superconductivity was discovered in solid mercury on April 8, 1911, by Heike Kamerlingh Onnes, who was studying the resistance of mercury at cryogenic temperatures using the recently produced liquid helium as a refrigerant. At the temperature of 4.2 K, he observed that the resistance abruptly disappeared. In the same experiment, he also observed the superfluid transition of helium at 2.2 K, without recognizing its significance. The precise date and circumstances of the discovery were only reconstructed a century later, when Onnes's notebook was found. In subsequent decades, superconductivity was observed in several other materials. In 1913, tin and lead were found to superconduct at 3.8 K and 7 K respectively, and in 1941 niobium nitride was found to superconduct at 16 K.

Formulating a theory of superconductivity was one of the hardest problems in physics during the 20th century.The breakthrough came from an experiment conducted by Meissner and Ochsenfeld in 1933, when they discovered that superconductors exponentially expelled all internal magnetic fields as it crosses the superconducting threshold, a phenomenon which has come to be known as the Meissner effect.

=== London constitutive equations ===
In 1934, the brothers Fritz and Heinz London came up with a phenemological theory that accounted for the Meissner effect. The theory is summarized by London constitutive equations. By using this equation, one can obtain the dependence of the magnetic field inside the superconductor on the distance to the surface.

The two constitutive equations for a superconductor by London are:

$$\frac{\partial \mathbf{j}}{\partial t} = \frac{n e^2}{m}\mathbf{E}, \qquad \mathbf{\nabla}\times\mathbf{j} =-\frac{n e^2}{m}\mathbf{B}.$$

The first equation is an equivalent of Ohm's Law for superconductors.

=== Conventional theories (1950s) ===
During the 1950s, theoretical condensed matter physicists arrived at an understanding of "conventional" superconductivity through a pair of theories: the phenomenological Ginzburg–Landau theory (1950) and the microscopic BCS theory (1957).

In 1950, the phenomenological Ginzburg–Landau theory of superconductivity was devised by Landau and Ginzburg. This theory, which combined Landau's theory of second-order phase transitions with a Schrödinger-like wave equation, had great success in explaining the macroscopic properties of superconductors. In particular, Abrikosov showed that Ginzburg–Landau theory predicts the division of superconductors into the two categories now referred to as Type I and Type II. Abrikosov and Ginzburg were awarded the 2003 Nobel Prize for their work (Landau had received the 1962 Nobel Prize for other work, and died in 1968). The four-dimensional extension of the Ginzburg–Landau theory, the Coleman-Weinberg model, is important in quantum field theory and cosmology.

Also in 1950, Maxwell and Reynolds et al. found that the critical temperature of a superconductor depends on the isotopic mass of the constituent element. This important discovery pointed to the electron–phonon interaction as the microscopic mechanism responsible for superconductivity.

The complete microscopic theory of superconductivity was finally proposed in 1957 by Bardeen, Cooper and Schrieffer. This BCS theory explained the superconducting current as a superfluid of Cooper pairs, pairs of electrons interacting through the exchange of phonons. For this work, the authors were awarded the Nobel Prize in 1972.

The BCS theory was set on a firmer footing in 1958, when N. N. Bogolyubov showed that the BCS wavefunction, which had originally been derived from a variational argument, could be obtained using a canonical transformation of the electronic Hamiltonian. In 1959, Lev Gor'kov showed that the BCS theory reduced to the Ginzburg–Landau theory close to the critical temperature.

Generalizations of BCS theory for conventional superconductors form the basis for the understanding of the phenomenon of superfluidity, because they fall into the lambda transition universality class. The extent to which such generalizations can be applied to unconventional superconductors is still controversial.

=== Niobium ===
The first practical application of superconductivity was developed in 1954 with Dudley Allen Buck's invention of the cryotron. Two superconductors with greatly different values of the critical magnetic field are combined to produce a fast, simple switch for computer elements.

Soon after discovering superconductivity in 1911, Kamerlingh Onnes attempted to make an electromagnet with superconducting windings but found that relatively low magnetic fields destroyed superconductivity in the materials he investigated. Much later, in 1955, G. B. Yntema succeeded in constructing a small 0.7-tesla iron-core electromagnet with superconducting niobium wire windings. Then, in 1961, J. E. Kunzler, E. Buehler, F. S. L. Hsu, and J. H. Wernick made the startling discovery that, at 4.2 kelvin, niobium–tin, a compound consisting of three parts niobium and one part tin, was capable of supporting a current density of more than 100,000 amperes per square centimeter in a magnetic field of 8.8 tesla. The alloy was brittle and difficult to fabricate, but niobium–tin proved useful for generating magnetic fields as high as 20 tesla.

In 1962, T. G. Berlincourt and R. R. Hake discovered that more ductile alloys of niobium and titanium are suitable for applications up to 10 tesla. Commercial production of niobium–titanium supermagnet wire immediately commenced at Westinghouse Electric Corporation and at Wah Chang Corporation. Although niobium–titanium boasts less-impressive superconducting properties than those of niobium–tin, niobium–titanium became the most widely used "workhorse" supermagnet material, in large measure a consequence of its very high ductility and ease of fabrication. However, both niobium–tin and niobium–titanium found wide application in MRI medical imagers, bending and focusing magnets for enormous high-energy-particle accelerators, and other applications. Conectus, a European superconductivity consortium, estimated that in 2014, global economic activity for which superconductivity was indispensable amounted to about five billion euros, with MRI systems accounting for about 80% of that total.

=== Josephson effect ===
In 1962, Josephson made the important theoretical prediction that a supercurrent can flow between two pieces of superconductor separated by a thin layer of insulator. This phenomenon, now called the Josephson effect, is exploited by superconducting devices such as SQUIDs. It is used in the most accurate available measurements of the magnetic flux quantum Φ_{0} = h/(2e), where h is the Planck constant. Coupled with the quantum Hall resistivity, this leads to a precise measurement of the Planck constant. Josephson was awarded the Nobel Prize for this work in 1973.

In 2008, it was proposed that the same mechanism that produces superconductivity could produce a superinsulator state in some materials, with almost infinite electrical resistance. The first development and study of superconducting Bose–Einstein condensate (BEC) in 2020 suggested a "smooth transition between" BEC and Bardeen-Cooper-Shrieffer regimes.

=== 2D materials ===
Multiple types of superconductivity are reported in devices made of single-layer materials. Some of these materials can switch between conducting, insulating, and other behaviors.

Twisting materials imbues them with a "moiré" pattern involving tiled hexagonal cells that act like atoms and host electrons. In this environment, the electrons move slowly enough for their collective interactions to guide their behavior. When each cell has a single electron, the electrons take on an antiferromagnetic arrangement; each electron can have a preferred location and magnetic orientation. Their intrinsic magnetic fields tend to alternate between pointing up and down. Adding electrons allows superconductivity by causing Cooper pairs to form. Fu and Schrade argued that electron-on-electron action was allowing both antiferromagnetic and superconducting states.

The first success with 2D materials involved a twisted bilayer graphene sheet (2018, T_{c} ~1.7 K, 1.1° twist). A twisted three-layer graphene device was later shown to superconduct (2021, T_{c} ~2.8 K). Then an untwisted trilayer graphene device was reported to superconduct (2022, T_{c} 1-2 K). The latter was later shown to be tunable, easily reproducing behavior found in millions of other configurations. Directly observing what happens when electrons are added to a material or slightly weakening its electric field enables quick testing of an unprecedented number of recipes to see which lead to superconductivity.

In four and five layer rhombohedral graphene, a form of superconductivity with spontaneously broken time reversal symmetry known as "chiral superconductivity" was recently observed. These systems were not observed to have any superlattice effects, and they can flip between two possible magnetic states without exiting the superconducting phase. This is in strong contrast to other observations of superconductivity and magnetic fields.

These devices have applications in quantum computing.

2D materials other than graphene have also been made to superconduct. Transition metal dichalcogenide (TMD) sheets twisted at 5 degrees intermittently achieved superconduction by creating a Josephson junction. The device used thin layers of palladium to connect to the sides of a tungsten telluride layer surrounded and protected by boron nitride. Another group demonstrated superconduction in molybdenum telluride (MoTe₂) in 2D van der Waals materials using ferroelectric domain walls. The T_{c} was implied to be higher than typical TMDs (~5–10 K).

A Cornell group added a 3.5-degree twist to an insulator that allowed electrons to slow down and interact strongly, leaving one electron per cell, exhibiting superconduction. Existing theories do not explain this behavior.

Fu and collaborators proposed that electrons arrange to form a repeating crystal that allows the electron grid to float independently of the background atomic nuclei and the electron grid to relax. Its ripples pair electrons the way phonons do, although this is unconfirmed.

== Classification ==
Superconductors are classified according to many criteria. The most common are:

=== Response to a magnetic field ===
A superconductor can be Type I, meaning it has a single critical field, above which superconductivity is lost and below which the magnetic field is completely expelled from the superconductor; or Type II, meaning it has two critical fields, between which it allows partial penetration of the magnetic field through isolated points called vortices. Furthermore, in multicomponent superconductors it is possible to combine the two behaviours. In that case the superconductor is of Type-1.5.

=== Theory of operation ===
A superconductor is conventional if it is driven by electron–phonon interaction and explained by the BCS theory or its extension, the Eliashberg theory. Otherwise, it is unconventional. Alternatively, a superconductor is called unconventional if the superconducting order parameter transforms according to a non-trivial irreducible representation of the system's point group or space group.

=== Critical temperature ===
A superconductor is generally considered high-temperature if it reaches a superconducting state above a temperature of 30 K (−243.15 °C); as in the initial discovery by Georg Bednorz and K. Alex Müller. It may also reference materials that transition to superconductivity when cooled using liquid nitrogen – that is, at only T_{c} > 77 K, although this is generally used only to emphasize that liquid nitrogen coolant is sufficient. Low temperature superconductors refer to materials with a critical temperature below 30 K, and are cooled mainly by liquid helium (T_{c} > 4.2 K). One exception to this rule is the iron pnictide group of superconductors that display behaviour and properties typical of high-temperature superconductors, yet some of the group have critical temperatures below 30 K.

=== Material ===
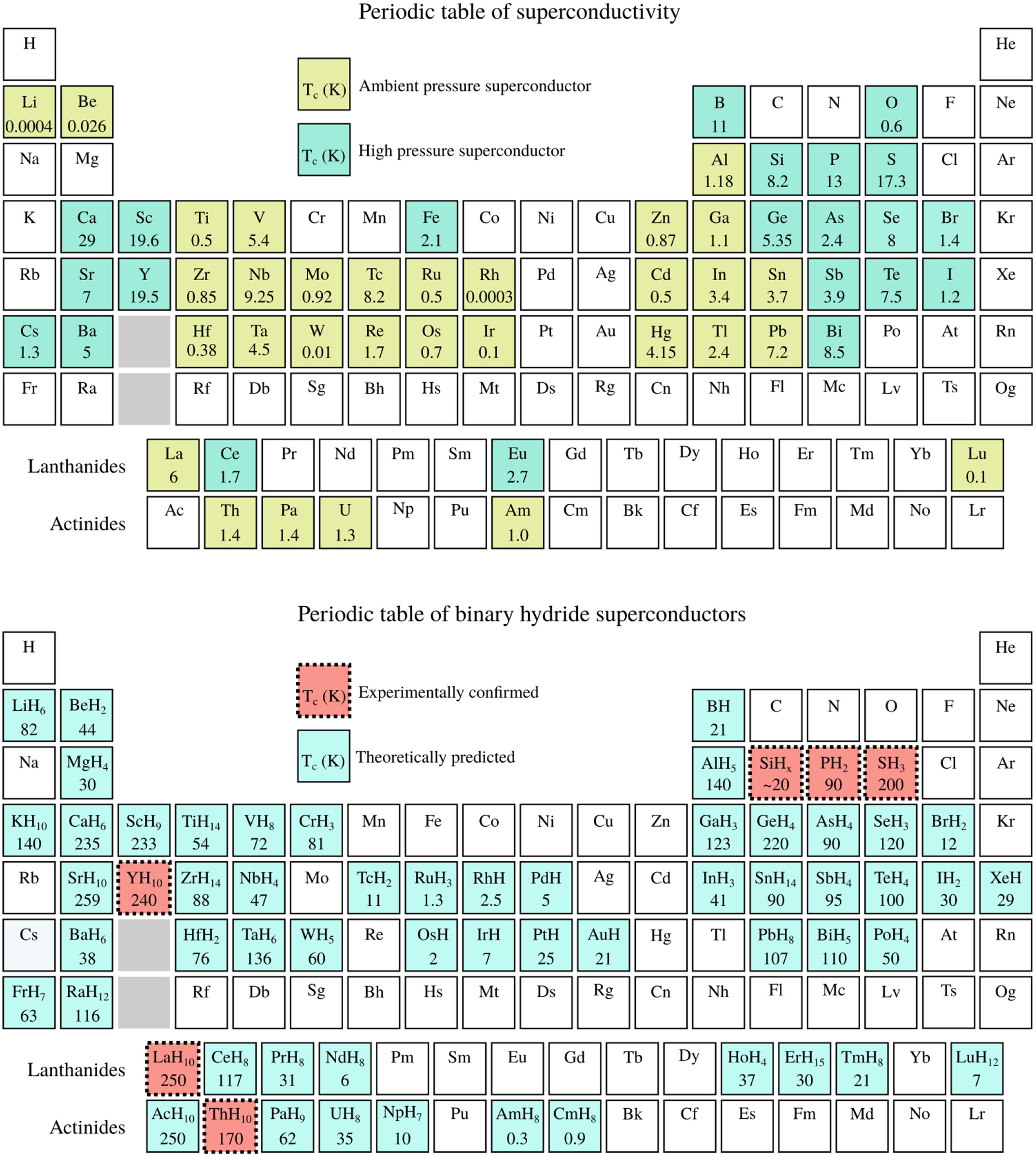
Top: Periodic table of superconducting elemental solids and their experimental critical temperature (T) Bottom: Periodic table of superconducting binary hydrides (0–300 GPa). Theoretical predictions indicated in blue and experimental results in red

Superconductor material classes include chemical elements (e.g. mercury or lead), alloys (such as niobium–titanium, germanium–niobium, and niobium nitride), ceramics (YBCO and magnesium diboride), superconducting pnictides (like fluorine-doped LaOFeAs), single-layer materials such as graphene and transition metal dichalcogenides, or organic superconductors (fullerenes and carbon nanotubes; though perhaps these examples should be included among the chemical elements, as they are composed entirely of carbon).

== Elementary properties ==
Several physical properties of superconductors vary from material to material, such as the critical temperature, the value of the superconducting gap, the critical magnetic field, and the critical current density at which superconductivity is destroyed. On the other hand, there is a class of properties that are independent of the underlying material. The Meissner effect, the quantization of the magnetic flux or permanent currents, i.e. the state of zero resistance are the most important examples. The existence of these "universal" properties is rooted in the nature of the broken symmetry of the superconductor and the emergence of off-diagonal long range order. Superconductivity is a thermodynamic phase, and thus possesses certain distinguishing properties which are largely independent of microscopic details. Off diagonal long range order is closely connected to the formation of Cooper pairs.

=== Zero electrical DC resistance ===
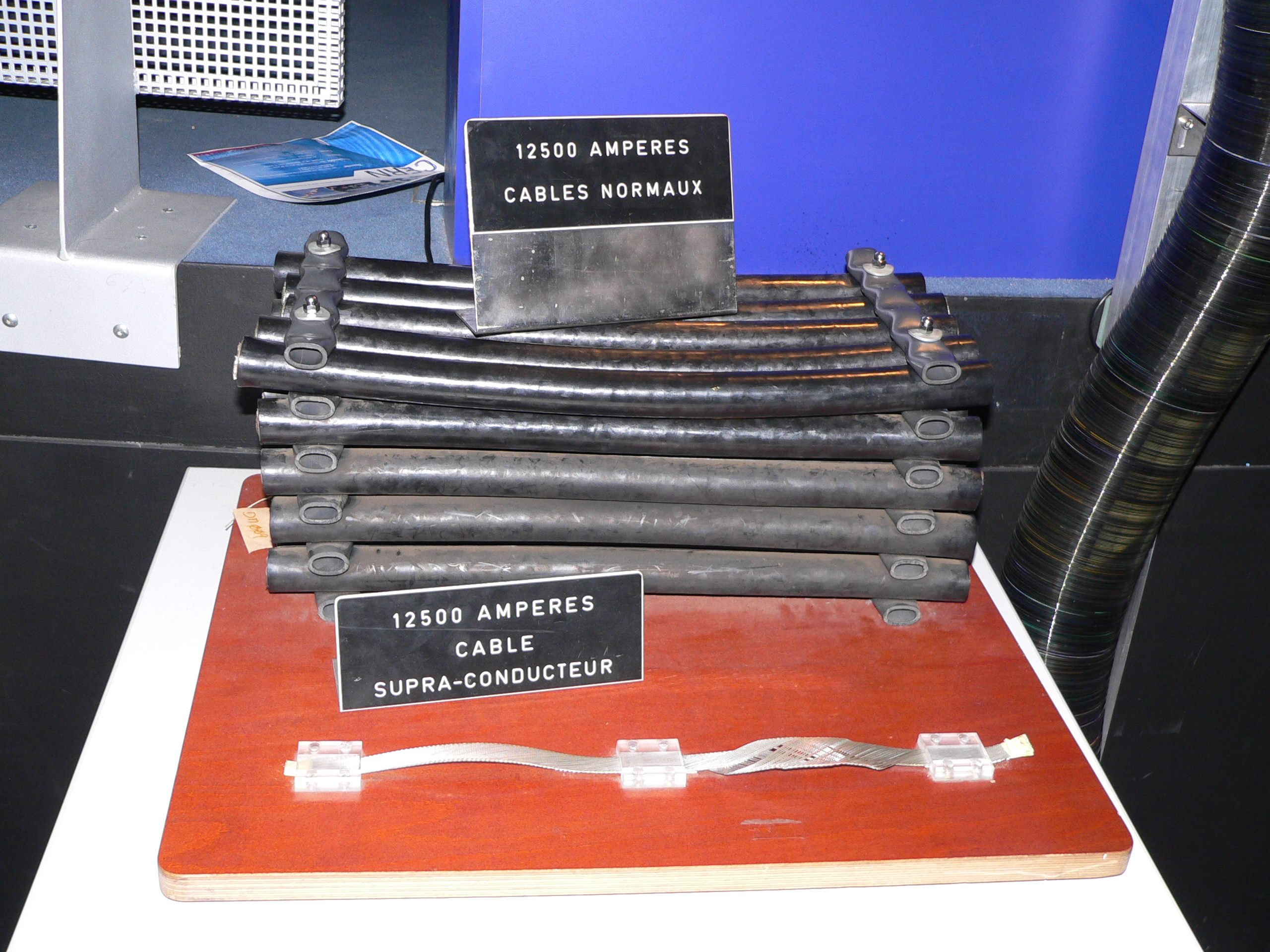
Electric cables for accelerators at CERN. Both the massive and slim cables are rated for 12,500 A. Top: regular cables for LEP; bottom: superconductor-based cables for the LHC

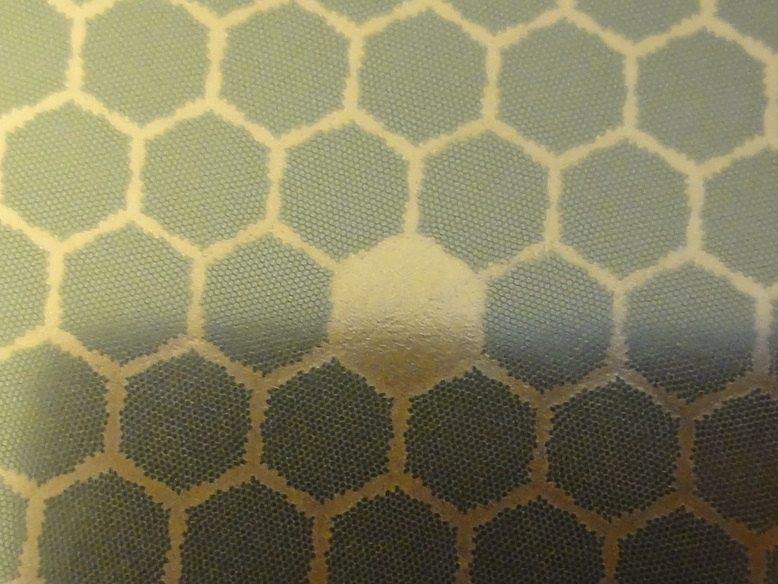
Cross section of a preformed superconductor rod from the abandoned Texas Superconducting Super Collider (SSC)

The simplest method to measure the electrical resistance of a sample of some material is to place it in an electrical circuit in series with a current source I and measure the resulting voltage V across the sample. The resistance of the sample is given by Ohm's law as R = V / I. If the voltage drop across the sample is zero, this means that the resistance is zero.

Superconductors are also able to maintain a current with no applied voltage whatsoever, a property exploited in superconducting electromagnets such as those found in MRI machines. Experiments have demonstrated that currents in superconducting coils can persist for years without any measurable degradation. Experimental evidence points to a lifetime of at least 100,000 years. Theoretical estimates for the lifetime of a persistent current can exceed the estimated lifetime of the universe, depending on the wire geometry and the temperature. In practice, currents injected in superconducting coils persisted for 28 years, 7 months, 27 days in a superconducting gravimeter in Belgium, from August 4, 1995 until March 31, 2024. In such instruments, the measurement is based on the monitoring of the levitation of a superconducting niobium sphere with a mass of four grams.

In a normal conductor, an electric current may be visualized as a fluid of electrons moving across a heavy ionic lattice. The electrons are constantly colliding with the ions in the lattice, and during each collision some of the energy carried by the current is absorbed by the lattice and converted into heat, which is essentially the vibrational kinetic energy of the lattice ions. As a result, the energy carried by the current is constantly being dissipated. This is the phenomenon of electrical resistance and Joule heating.

The situation is different in a superconductor. In a conventional superconductor, the electronic fluid cannot be resolved into individual electrons. Instead, it consists of bound pairs of electrons known as Cooper pairs. This pairing is caused by an attractive force between electrons from the exchange of phonons. This pairing is very weak, and small thermal vibrations can fracture the bond. Due to quantum mechanics, the energy spectrum of this Cooper pair fluid possesses an energy gap, meaning there is a minimum amount of energy ΔE that must be supplied in order to excite the fluid. Therefore, if ΔE is larger than the thermal energy of the lattice, given by kT, where k is the Boltzmann constant and T is the temperature, the fluid will not be scattered by the lattice. The Cooper pair fluid is thus a superfluid, meaning it can flow without energy dissipation.

In the class of superconductors known as type II superconductors, including all known high-temperature superconductors, an extremely low but non-zero resistivity appears at temperatures not too far below the nominal superconducting transition when an electric current is applied in conjunction with a strong magnetic field, which may be caused by the electric current. This is due to the motion of magnetic vortices in the electronic superfluid, which dissipates some of the energy carried by the current. If the current is sufficiently small, the vortices are stationary, and the resistivity vanishes. The resistance due to this effect is minuscule compared with that of non-superconducting materials, but must be taken into account in sensitive experiments. However, as the temperature decreases far enough below the nominal superconducting transition, these vortices can become frozen into a disordered but stationary phase known as a "vortex glass". Below this vortex glass transition temperature, the resistance of the material becomes truly zero.

=== Phase transition ===
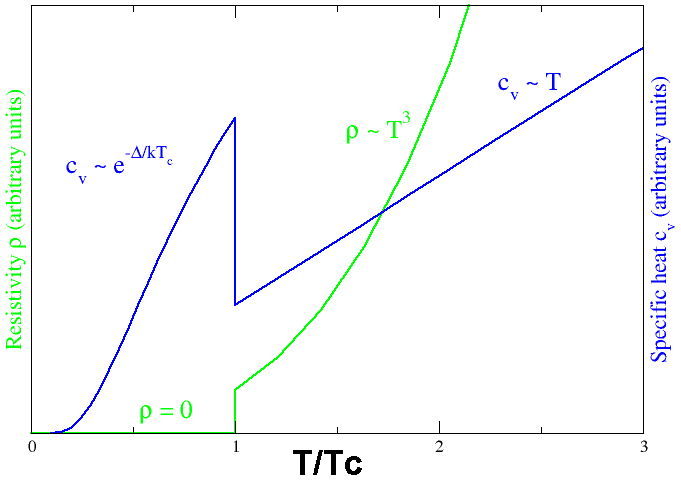
Behavior of heat capacity (c_{v}, blue) and resistivity (ρ, green) at the superconducting phase transition

In superconducting materials, the characteristics of superconductivity appear when the temperature T is lowered below a critical temperature T_{c}. The value of this critical temperature varies from material to material. Conventional superconductors usually have critical temperatures ranging from around 20 K to less than 1 K. Solid mercury, for example, has a critical temperature of 4.2 K. As of 2015, the highest critical temperature found for a conventional superconductor is 203 K for H_{2}S, although high pressures of approximately 90 gigapascals were required. Cuprate superconductors can have much higher critical temperatures: YBa_{2}Cu_{3}O_{7}, one of the first cuprate superconductors to be discovered, has a critical temperature above 90 K, and mercury-based cuprates have been found with critical temperatures in excess of 130 K. The basic physical mechanism responsible for the high critical temperature is not yet clear. However, it is clear that a two-electron pairing is involved, although the nature of the pairing ($s$ wave vs. $d$ wave) remains controversial.

Similarly, at a fixed temperature below the critical temperature, superconducting materials cease to superconduct when an external magnetic field is applied which is greater than the critical magnetic field. This is because the Gibbs free energy of the superconducting phase increases quadratically with the magnetic field while the free energy of the normal phase is roughly independent of the magnetic field. If the material superconducts in the absence of a field, then the superconducting phase free energy is lower than that of the normal phase and so for some finite value of the magnetic field (proportional to the square root of the difference of the free energies at zero magnetic field) the two free energies will be equal and a phase transition to the normal phase will occur. More generally, a higher temperature and a stronger magnetic field lead to a smaller fraction of electrons that are superconducting and consequently to a longer London penetration depth of external magnetic fields and currents. The penetration depth becomes infinite at the phase transition.

The onset of superconductivity is accompanied by abrupt changes in various physical properties, which is the hallmark of a phase transition. For example, the electronic heat capacity is proportional to the temperature in the normal (non-superconducting) regime. At the superconducting transition, it suffers a discontinuous jump and thereafter ceases to be linear. At low temperatures, it varies instead as e^{−α/T} for some constant, α. This exponential behavior is one of the pieces of evidence for the existence of the energy gap.

The order of the superconducting phase transition was long a matter of debate. Experiments indicate that the transition is second-order, meaning there is no latent heat. However, in the presence of an external magnetic field there is latent heat, because the superconducting phase has a lower entropy below the critical temperature than the normal phase. It has been experimentally demonstrated that, as a consequence, when the magnetic field is increased beyond the critical field, the resulting phase transition leads to a decrease in the temperature of the superconducting material.

Calculations in the 1970s suggested that it may actually be weakly first-order due to the effect of long-range fluctuations in the electromagnetic field. In the 1980s it was shown theoretically with the help of a disorder field theory, in which the vortex lines of the superconductor play a major role, that the transition is of second order within the type II regime and of first order (i.e., latent heat) within the type I regime, and that the two regions are separated by a tricritical point. The results were strongly supported by Monte Carlo computer simulations.

=== Meissner effect ===
Meissner effect in a high-temperature superconductor (black pellet) with a NdFeB magnet (metallic)

When a superconductor is placed in a weak external magnetic field B_{a}=H_{a}, and cooled below its transition temperature, the magnetic field is ejected. The Meissner effect does not cause the field to be completely ejected but instead, the field penetrates the superconductor but only to a very small distance, characterized by a parameter λ, called the London penetration depth, decaying exponentially to zero within the bulk of the material. The Meissner effect is a defining characteristic of superconductivity. For most superconductors, the London penetration depth is on the order of 100 nm.

The Meissner effect is sometimes confused with the kind of diamagnetism one would expect in a perfect electrical conductor: according to Lenz's law, when a changing magnetic field is applied to a conductor, it will induce an electric current in the conductor that creates an opposing magnetic field. In a perfect conductor, an arbitrarily large current can be induced, and the resulting magnetic field exactly cancels the applied field.

The Meissner effect is distinct from this – it is the spontaneous expulsion that occurs during transition to superconductivity. Suppose we have a material in its normal state, containing a constant internal magnetic field. When the material is cooled below the critical temperature, we would observe the abrupt expulsion of the internal magnetic field, which we would not expect based on Lenz's law.

The Meissner effect was given a phenomenological explanation by the brothers Fritz and Heinz London, who showed that the electromagnetic free energy in a superconductor is minimized provided
$$\nabla^2\mathbf{B} = \lambda^{-2} \mathbf{B}\,$$
where B is the magnetic field and λ is the London penetration depth.

This equation, which is known as the London equation, predicts that the magnetic field in a superconductor decays exponentially from whatever value it possesses at the surface.

A superconductor with little or no magnetic field within it is said to be in the Meissner state. The Meissner state breaks down when the applied magnetic field is too large. Superconductors can be divided into two classes according to how this breakdown occurs. In Type I superconductors, superconductivity is abruptly destroyed when the strength of the applied field rises above a critical value H_{c}. Depending on the geometry of the sample, one may obtain an intermediate state consisting of a baroque pattern of regions of normal material carrying a magnetic field mixed with regions of superconducting material containing no field. In Type II superconductors, raising the applied field past a critical value H_{c1} leads to a mixed state (also known as the vortex state) in which an increasing amount of magnetic flux penetrates the material, but there remains no resistance to the flow of electric current as long as the current is not too large. At a second critical field strength H_{c2}, superconductivity is destroyed. The mixed state is actually caused by vortices in the electronic superfluid, sometimes called fluxons because the flux carried by these vortices is quantized. Most pure elemental superconductors, except niobium and carbon nanotubes, are Type I, while almost all impure and compound superconductors are Type II.

=== London moment ===
Conversely, a spinning superconductor generates a magnetic field, precisely aligned with the spin axis. The effect, the London moment, was put to good use in Gravity Probe B. This experiment measured the magnetic fields of four superconducting gyroscopes to determine their spin axes. This was critical to the experiment since it is one of the few ways to accurately determine the spin axis of an otherwise featureless sphere.

== High-temperature superconductivity ==
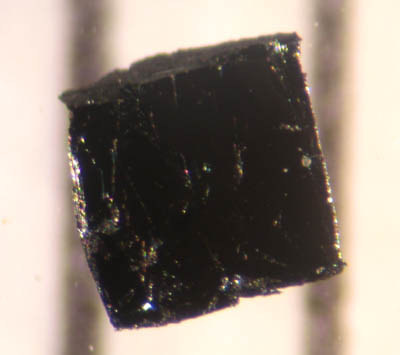
A sample of bismuth strontium calcium copper oxide (BSCCO), which is currently one of the most practical high-temperature superconductors. Notably, it does not contain rare earths. BSCCO is a cuprate superconductor based on bismuth and strontium. Thanks to its higher operating temperature, cuprates are now becoming competitors for more ordinary niobium-based superconductors, as well as magnesium diboride superconductors.

High-temperature superconductivity (high-T_{c} or HTS) is superconductivity in materials with a critical temperature (the temperature below which the material behaves as a superconductor) above 77 K (−196.2 °C; −321.1 °F), the boiling point of liquid nitrogen. They are "high-temperature" only relative to previously known superconductors, which function only closer to absolute zero. The first high-temperature superconductor was discovered in 1986 by IBM researchers Georg Bednorz and K. Alex Müller. Although the critical temperature is around 35.1 K (−238.1 °C; −396.5 °F), this material was modified by Ching-Wu Chu to make the first high-temperature superconductor with critical temperature 93 K (−180.2 °C; −292.3 °F). Bednorz and Müller were awarded the Nobel Prize in Physics in 1987 "for their important break-through in the discovery of superconductivity in ceramic materials". Most high-T_{c} materials are type-II superconductors.

The major advantage of high-temperature superconductors is that they can be cooled using liquid nitrogen, in contrast to previously known superconductors, which require expensive and hard-to-handle coolants, primarily liquid helium. A second advantage of high-T_{c} materials is they retain their superconductivity in higher magnetic fields than previous materials. This is important when constructing superconducting magnets, a primary application of high-T_{c} materials.

The majority of high-temperature superconductors are ceramics, rather than the previously known metallic materials. Ceramic superconductors are suitable for some practical uses but encounter manufacturing issues. For example, most ceramics are brittle, which complicates wire fabrication.

The main class of high-temperature superconductors is copper oxides combined with other metals, especially the rare-earth barium copper oxides (REBCOs) such as yttrium barium copper oxide (YBCO). The second class of high-temperature superconductors in the practical classification is the iron-based compounds. Magnesium diboride is sometimes included in high-temperature superconductors: It is relatively simple to manufacture, but it superconducts only below 39 K (−234.2 °C), which makes it unsuitable for liquid nitrogen cooling.

== Applications ==
Video of superconducting levitation of YBCO

Superconductors are promising candidate materials for devising fundamental circuit elements of electronic, spintronic, and quantum technologies. One such example is a superconducting diode, in which supercurrent flows along one direction only, that promise dissipationless superconducting and semiconducting-superconducting hybrid technologies.

Superconducting magnets are some of the most powerful electromagnets known. They are used in MRI/NMR machines, mass spectrometers, the beam-steering magnets used in particle accelerators and plasma confining magnets in some tokamaks. They can also be used for magnetic separation, where weakly magnetic particles are extracted from a background of less or non-magnetic particles, as in the pigment industries. They can also be used in large wind turbines to overcome the restrictions imposed by high electrical currents, with an industrial grade 3.6 megawatt superconducting windmill generator having been tested successfully in Denmark.

In the 1950s and 1960s, superconductors were used to build experimental digital computers using cryotron switches. More recently, superconductors have been used to make digital circuits based on rapid single flux quantum technology and RF and microwave filters for mobile phone base stations.

Superconductors are used to build Josephson junctions, heterostructures consisting of two superconducting regions coupled through for example a normal conducting (S-N-S) or insulating (S-I-S) barrier, which are the building blocks of SQUIDs (superconducting quantum interference devices), the most sensitive magnetometers known. SQUIDs are used in scanning SQUID microscopes and magnetoencephalography. Series of Josephson devices are used to realize the SI volt. Superconducting photon detectors can be realised in a variety of device configurations. Depending on the particular mode of operation, a superconductor–insulator–superconductor Josephson junction can be used as a photon detector or as a mixer. The large resistance change at the transition from the normal to the superconducting state is used to build thermometers in cryogenic micro-calorimeter photon detectors. The same effect is used in ultrasensitive bolometers made from superconducting materials. Superconducting nanowire single-photon detectors using niobium alloy nanowires offer high speed, low noise single-photon detection and have been employed widely in advanced photon-counting applications.

Other early markets are arising where the relative efficiency, size and weight advantages of devices based on high-temperature superconductivity outweigh the additional costs involved. For example, in wind turbines the lower weight and volume of superconducting generators could lead to savings in construction and tower costs, offsetting the higher costs for the generator and lowering the total levelized cost of electricity (LCOE).

Promising future applications include high-performance smart grid, electric power transmission, transformers, power storage devices, compact fusion power devices, electric motors (e.g. for vehicle propulsion, as in vactrains or maglev trains), magnetic levitation devices, fault current limiters, enhancing spintronic devices with superconducting materials, and superconducting magnetic refrigeration. However, superconductivity is sensitive to moving magnetic fields, so applications that use alternating current (e.g. transformers) will be more difficult to develop than those that rely upon direct current. Compared to traditional power lines, superconducting transmission lines are more efficient and require only a fraction of the space, which would not only lead to a better environmental performance but could also improve public acceptance for expansion of the electric grid. Another attractive industrial aspect is the ability for high power transmission at lower voltages. Advancements in the efficiency of cooling systems and use of cheap coolants such as liquid nitrogen have also significantly decreased cooling costs needed for superconductivity.

== Nobel Prizes ==
As of 2022, there have been five Nobel Prizes in Physics for superconductivity related subjects:

- Heike Kamerlingh Onnes (1913), "for his investigations on the properties of matter at low temperatures which led, inter alia, to the production of liquid helium".
- John Bardeen, Leon N. Cooper, and J. Robert Schrieffer (1972), "for their jointly developed theory of superconductivity, usually called the BCS-theory".
- Leo Esaki, Ivar Giaever, and Brian D. Josephson (1973), "for their experimental discoveries regarding tunneling phenomena in semiconductors and superconductors, respectively" and "for his theoretical predictions of the properties of a supercurrent through a tunnel barrier, in particular those phenomena which are generally known as the Josephson effects".
- Georg Bednorz and K. Alex Müller (1987), "for their important break-through in the discovery of superconductivity in ceramic materials".
- Alexei A. Abrikosov, Vitaly L. Ginzburg, and Anthony J. Leggett (2003), "for pioneering contributions to the theory of superconductors and superfluids".

== See also ==
- BCS theory – Microscopic theory of superconductivity
- Cooper pair – Pair of electrons bound together at low temperature, allowing for superconductivity
- Hydrogen cryomagnetics – Use of cryogenic liquid hydrogen to cool an electromagnet
- Meissner effect – Expulsion of a magnetic field from a superconductor
- MXenes – Class of two-dimensional inorganic compounds
- Potential applications of graphene
- Superconducting magnetic energy storage – Energy storage technique
