= London penetration depth =

Distance to which a magnetic field penetrates into a superconductor

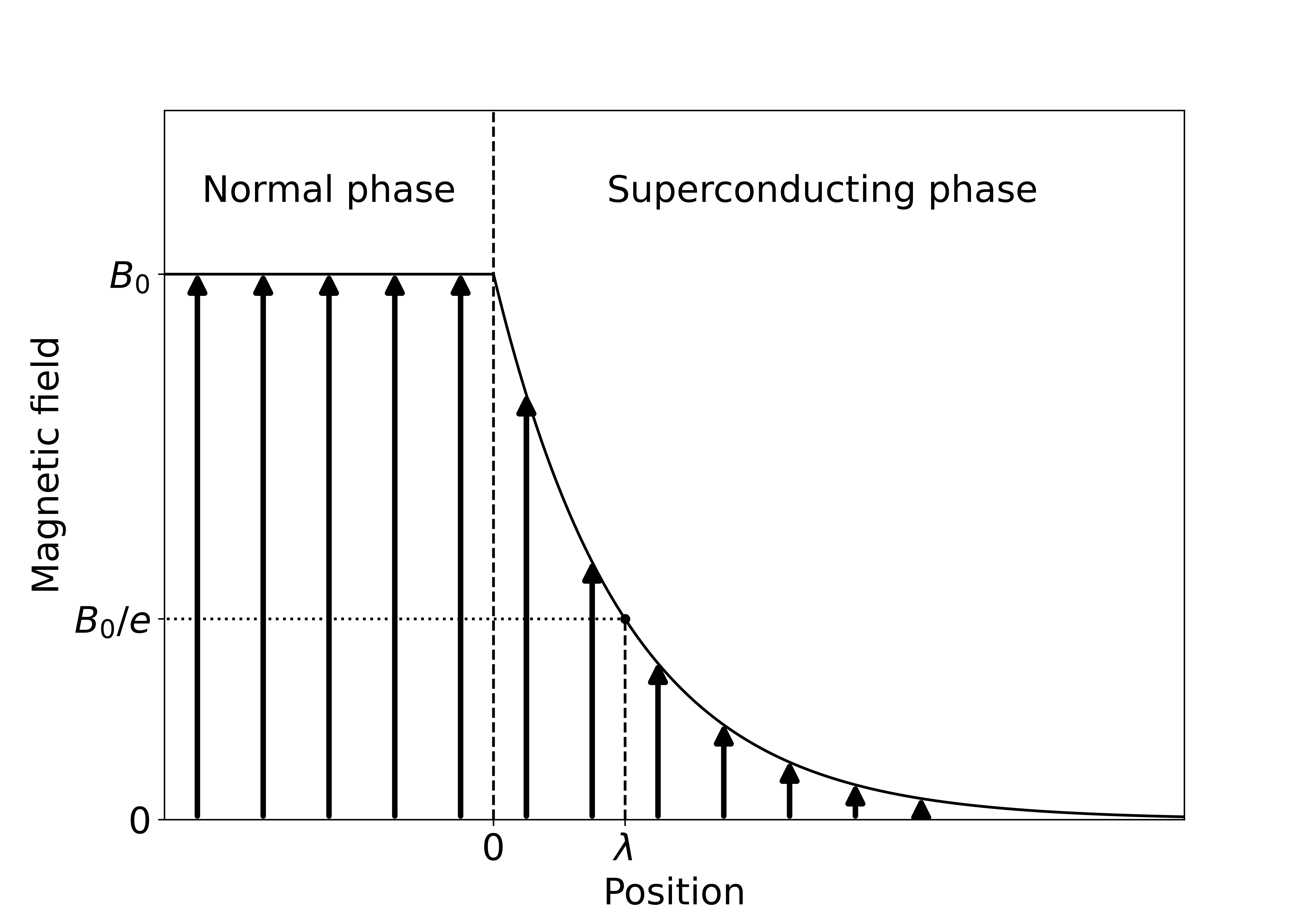
The magnetic field strength as a function of position at the boundary between a normal conductor and a superconductor given an external magnetic field $B_0$.

In superconductors, the London penetration depth (usually denoted as $\lambda$ or $\lambda_L$) characterizes the distance to which a magnetic field penetrates into a superconductor and becomes equal to $e^{-1}$ times that of the magnetic field at the surface of the superconductor. Typical values of λ_{L} range from 50 to 500 nm. It was first derived by Geertruida de Haas-Lorentz in 1925, and later by Fritz and Heinz London in their London equations (1935).

The London penetration depth results from considering the London equation and Ampère's circuital law. If one considers a superconducting half-space, i.e. superconducting for x>0, and weak external magnetic field B_{0} applied along z direction in the empty space x<0, then inside the superconductor the magnetic field is given by
$$B(x) = B_0\exp\left(-\frac{x}{\lambda_L}\right),$$
$\lambda_L$ can be seen as the distance across in which the magnetic field becomes $e$ times weaker. The form of $\lambda_L$ is found by this method to be
$$\lambda_L=\sqrt{\frac{m}{\mu_0 n q^2}},$$
for charge carriers of mass $m$, number density $n$ and charge $q$.

The penetration depth is determined by the superfluid density, which is an important quantity that determines T_{c} in high-temperature superconductors. If some superconductors have some node in their energy gap, the penetration depth at 0 K depends on magnetic field because superfluid density is changed by magnetic field and vice versa. So, accurate and precise measurements of the absolute value of penetration depth at 0 K are very important to understand the mechanism of high-temperature superconductivity.

There are various experimental techniques to determine the London penetration depth, and in particular its temperature dependence. London penetration depth can be measured by muon spin spectroscopy when the superconductor does not have an intrinsic magnetic constitution. The penetration depth is directly converted from the depolarization rate of muon spin in relation which σ(T) is proportional to λ^{2}(T). The shape of σ(T) is different with the kind of superconducting energy gap in temperature, so that this immediately indicates the shape of energy gap and gives some clues about the origin of superconductivity.
