= Fritz London =

American German physicist (1900–1954)

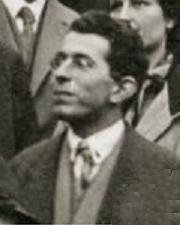
- Fritz London (1928)
- Born: Fritz Wolfgang London; March 7, 1900; Breslau, Silesia, Germany
- Died: March 30, 1954 (aged 54); Durham, North Carolina
- Citizenship: German, American
- Known for: Quantum chemistry London dispersion forces London equations London moment London penetration depth
- Awards: Lorentz Medal (1953)
- Scientific career
- Fields: Theoretical physics
- Workplaces: Duke University; University of Berlin; University of Oxford; Collège de France
- Academic advisors: Max von Laue

Fritz Wolfgang London (March 7, 1900 – March 30, 1954) was a German born physicist and professor at Duke University. His fundamental contributions to the theories of chemical bonding and of intermolecular forces (London dispersion forces) are today considered classic and are discussed in standard textbooks of physical chemistry. With his brother Heinz London, he made a significant contribution to understanding electromagnetic properties of superconductors with the London equations and was nominated for the Nobel Prize in Chemistry on five occasions.

== Biography ==
London was born in Breslau, Germany (now Wrocław, Poland) as the son of Franz London (1863-1917). Being a Jew, London lost his position at the University of Berlin after Adolf Hitler's Nazi Party passed the 1933 racial laws. He took visiting positions in England and France, and emigrated to the United States in 1939, of which he became a naturalized citizen in 1945. Later in his life, London was a professor at Duke University. He was awarded the Lorentz Medal in 1953. He died from a heart ailment in Durham, North Carolina, in 1954.

== Academic achievements ==
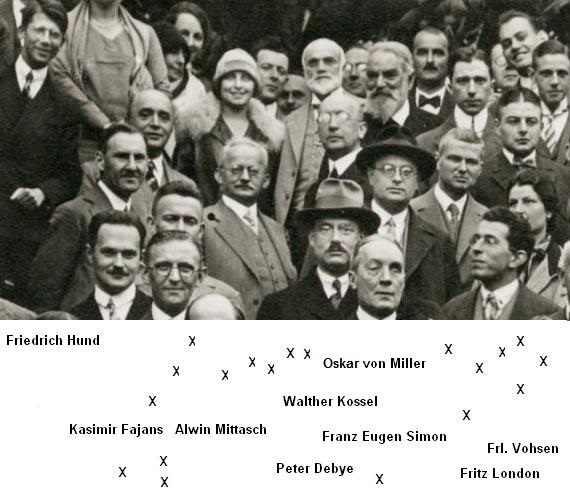
Fritz London at the Bunsen Congress, Munich, 1928

London's early work with Walter Heitler on chemical bonding is now treated in any textbook on physical chemistry. This paper was the first to properly explain the bonding in a homonuclear molecule such as H_{2}. It is no coincidence that the Heitler–London theory appeared shortly after the introduction of quantum mechanics by Werner Heisenberg and Erwin Schrödinger, because quantum mechanics was crucial in their explanation of the covalent bond. Another necessary ingredient was the realization that electrons are indistinguishable, as expressed in the Pauli principle.

Other early work of London was in the area of intermolecular forces. He coined the expression "dispersion effect" for the attraction between two rare gas atoms at large (say about 1 nanometer) distance from each other. Nowadays this attraction is often referred to as "London force". In 1930 he gave (together with R. Eisenschitz) a unified treatment of the interaction between two noble gas atoms that attract each other at large distance, but repel each other at short distances. Eisenschitz and London showed that this repulsion is a consequence of enforcing the electronic wavefunction to be antisymmetric under electron permutations. This antisymmetry is required by the Pauli principle and the fact that electrons are fermions.

For atoms and nonpolar molecules, the London dispersion force is the only intermolecular force, and is responsible for their existence in liquid and solid states. For polar molecules, this force is one part of the van der Waals force, along with forces between the permanent molecular dipole moments.

London was the first theoretical physicist to make the fundamental, and at the time controversial, suggestion that superfluidity is intrinsically related to the Einstein condensation of bosons, a phenomenon now known as Bose–Einstein condensation. Bose recognized that the statistics of massless photons could also be applied to massive particles; he did not contribute to the theory of the condensation of bosons.

London was also one of the early authors (including Schrödinger) to have properly understood the principle of local gauge invariance (Weyl) in the context of the then new quantum mechanics.

London predicted the effect of flux quantization in superconductors and with his brother Heinz postulated that the electrodynamics of superconductors is described by a massive field, i.e., that whilst magnetic flux is expelled from a superconductor, this happens exponentially over a finite length with an exponent which is now called the London penetration depth.

London also developed a theory of a rotational response of a superconductor, pointing out that rotation of a superconductor generates a magnetic field London moment. This effect is used in models of the rotational dynamics of neutron stars.

== Fritz London Memorial Lectures and Prize ==
Since 1956, the Fritz London Memorial Lectures have brought to the scientific community at Duke University a distinguished group of lecturers including twenty Nobel laureates. The scientific interests of each lecturer impinge at one or more points upon the various fields of physics and chemistry to which Fritz London contributed. In December 1972, John Bardeen, two-time winner of the Nobel Prize in Physics, established an endowment fund "to perpetuate the memory of Fritz London, distinguished scientist and member of the Duke faculty from 1939 to the time of his death in 1954, and to promote research and understanding of Physics at Duke University and in the wider scientific community". The fund is to be used to underwrite the Fritz London Memorial Prize, given in recognition of outstanding contributions in Low Temperature Physics, and provide support for the London Memorial Lectures at Duke University.
