= Biofield =

Biofield may refer to:

== Science & medicine ==
- Electrophysiology, scientific study of electrical properties of cells and tissues
  - Electroreception, sensory of electric fields by organisms
  - Magnetoception, sensory of magnetic fields by organisms
  - Bioelectromagnetics, scientific study of electric biofields of organisms
- Medical imaging, scientific magnetic or electrical biofield imaging
  - Magnetoencephalography, brain imaging by magnetic field sensing
  - Electroencephalography, brain imaging by electric field sensing
  - Magnetocardiography, heart imaging by sensing its magnetic field
  - Magnetogastrography, stomach imaging by sensing magnetic fields
  - Magnetomyography, muscle imaging by sensing magnetic fields, produced by electrical impulses

== Mythology & alternative medicine ==
- Energy (esotericism), biopsychospiritual energy
  - Aura (paranormal)
  - Prana
  - Qi
  - Vital energy
- Energy medicine, alternative medicine
  - Energy field disturbance
  - Ionized jewelry
  - Magnet therapy
  - Negative air ionization therapy
  - Qigong
  - Radionics
  - Reiki

== Other uses ==
- BioFields, a Mexican algal fuel producer
