= John Wikswo =

- Born: October 6, 1949 (age 77); Lynchburg, Virginia, United States
- Scientific career
- Fields: Biological Physics
- Workplaces: Vanderbilt University

John Peter Wikswo, Jr. (born October 6, 1949) is a biological physicist at Vanderbilt University. He was born in Lynchburg, Virginia, United States.

Wikswo is noted for his work on biomagnetism and cardiac electrophysiology.

== Graduate school ==
In the 1970s, Wikswo was a graduate student at Stanford University, where he worked under physicist William M. Fairbank, studying magnetocardiography.

== Biomagnetism ==
In 1977 he became an assistant professor in the Department of Physics and Astronomy at Vanderbilt University, where he set up a laboratory to study living state physics. In 1980, he made the first measurement of the magnetic field of an isolated nerve, by threading the a frog sciatic nerve through a wire-wound, ferrite-core toroid and detecting the induced current using a SQUID magnetometer. At the same time, Wikswo and Ken Swinney calculated the magnetic field of a nerve axon. This work was followed a few years later by the first detailed comparison of the measured and calculated magnetic field produced by a single nerve axon.

In a related line of study, Wikswo collaborated with Vanderbilt Professor John Barach to analyze the information content of biomagnetic versus bioelectric signals.

== Cardiac electrophysiology ==
One of Wikswo's most important contributions to science is his work in cardiac electrophysiology. In 1987 he began collaborating with doctors at the Vanderbilt Medical School, including Dan Roden, to study electrical propagation in the dog heart. These studies led to the discovery of the virtual cathode effect in cardiac tissue: during electrical stimulation, the action potential wave front originated farther from the electrode in the direction perpendicular to the myocardial fibers than in the direction parallel to them.

In parallel with these experimental studies, Wikswo analyzed the virtual cathode effect theoretically using the bidomain model, a mathematical model of the electrical properties of cardiac tissue that takes into account the anisotropic properties of both the intracellular and extracellular spaces. He first used the bidomain model to interpret biomagnetic measurements from strands of cardiac tissue. Wikswo realized that the property of unequal anisotropy ratios in cardiac tissue (the ratio of electrical conductivity in the directions parallel and perpendicular to the myocardial fibers is different in the intracellular and extracellular spaces) has important implications for the magnetic field associated with a propagating action potential wave front in the heart. With Nestor Sepulveda, Wikswo use the finite element method to calculate the distinctive fourfold symmetric magnetic field pattern produced by an outwardly propagating wave front.

Unequal anisotropy ratios has even an even greater impact during electrical stimulation of the heart. Again using the finite element model, Wikswo, Roth and Sepulveda predicted the transmembrane potential distribution around a unipolar electrode passing current into a passive, two-dimensional sheet of cardiac tissue. They found that the region of depolarization under a cathode extends farther in the direction perpendicular to the fibers than parallel to the fibers, a shape that Wikswo named the dog-bone. This prediction immediately explained the virtual cathode effect found experimentally in the dog heart; they were observing the dog-bone shaped virtual cathode. Later simulations using an active, time-dependent bidomain model confirmed this conclusion.

The calculation of the transmembrane potential by a unipolar electrode resulted in another prediction: regions of hyperpolarization adjacent to the cathode in the direction parallel to the myocardial fibers. Reversal of the stimulus polarization provided a mechanism for anodal stimulation of cardiac tissue. In order to test this prediction experimentally, Wikswo mastered the technique of optical mapping using voltage sensitive dyes, allowing the measurement of transmembrane potential using optical methods. With Marc Lin, Wikswo made high resolution measurements of excitation following stimulation through a unipolar electrode in a rabbit heart, and confirmed four mechanisms of electrical stimulation—cathode make, cathode break, anode make, and anode break—that had been predicted by bidomain calculations. (Cathode and anode refer to the polarity of the stimulus, and make and break indicate if the excitation occurred following the start or end of the stimulus pulse.) Later experiments using this technique led to the prediction of a new type of cardiac arrhythmia, which Wikswo named quatrefoil reentry.

== SQUID magnetometers ==
In the 1990s, Wikswo began developing high spatial resolution SQUID magnetometers for mapping the magnetic field, to use in both biomagnetic studies and in non-destructive testing. As is characteristic of Wikswo's work, he simultaneously developed theoretical methods to image a two-dimensional current density distribution from magnetic field measurements.

== VIIBRE ==
In the first two decades of the 21st century, Wikswo's research has emphasized the development and application of micro- and nano-scale devices for instrumenting and controlling single cells. In 2001 he founded the Vanderbilt Institute for Integrative Biosystems Research and Education (VIIBRE) to foster and enhance interdisciplinary research in the biophysical sciences and bioengineering at Vanderbilt. Wikswo refocused his research on systems biology, building microfabricated devices for measuring cellular properties and developing mathematical models of cellular signaling. He has designed organ-on-a-chip devices containing small populations of cells to fill the gaps between cell cultures and animals models, for use in pharmacology and toxicology. This work led to a second R&D 100 Award for the MultiWell MicroFormulator, which delivers and removes cell culture media to each of the 96 wells of a microwell plate for toxicology research.

== Other positions ==
He also serves on the scientific advisory boards of Hypres Inc. and CardioMag Imaging Inc.

== Brief curriculum vitae ==
- 1970 B.A., Physics, University of Virginia
- 1973 M.S., Physics, Stanford University
- 1975 Ph.D., Physics, Stanford University
- 1975-1977 Research Fellow in Cardiology, Stanford University School of Medicine
- 1977-1982 Assistant Professor of Physics, Vanderbilt University
- 1982-1988 Associate Professor of Physics, Vanderbilt University
- 1988–present Professor of Physics, Vanderbilt University
- 2001–present Gordon A. Cain University Professor, Vanderbilt University
- 2001–present Professor of Biomedical Engineering, Vanderbilt University
- 2001–present Professor of Molecular Physiology and Biophysics, Vanderbilt University
- 2001–present Director, Vanderbilt Institute for Integrative Biosystems Research and Education
- 2005–present A.B. Learned Professor in Living State Physics, Vanderbilt University

=== Awards ===
Year	Award
1980–1982	Alfred P. Sloan Research Fellow
1984	IR-100 Award for Neuromagnetic Current Probe
1989	Fellow, American Physical Society
1999	Fellow, American Institute for Medical and Biological Engineering
2001	Fellow, American Heart Association
2005	Fellow, Biomedical Engineering Society
2006	Fellow, Heart Rhythm Society
2008	Fellow, IEEE
2017	R&D 100 Award for the MultiWell MicroFormulator
