= David Cohen (physicist) =

Canadian physicist

David Cohen made many of the first pioneering measurements in the area of biomagnetism (magnetic fields produced by the body), although he was initially trained as a nuclear physicist.

== Early life and education ==
Cohen was born of immigrant parents in Winnipeg, Manitoba, Canada. He was raised there and earned a B.A. degree at the University of Manitoba. Then, he attended graduate school at the University of California, Berkeley, where he gained a Ph.D. in experimental nuclear physics.

== Career ==
Working in this area, and using large magnets, he became interested in the other extreme; this was the measurement of very weak magnetic fields, which for example might be produced by the weak natural currents in the human body. In 1963, he proposed a method using a magnetically shielded room to keep out external magnetic disturbances, as in radiation shielding in nuclear experiments. At that time others reported the first biomagnetic measurement, where the MCG (magnetocardiogram, the magnetic field due to heart currents) was measured; this was done without shielding, hence showed much external interference. Cohen then built a modest shielded room, and with somewhat clearer signals verified the heart's magnetic field. He also made the first measurement of the MEG (magnetoencephalogram, the magnetic field of the brain). However, all these early biomagnetic measurements were generally too noisy, both because of the use of insensitive detectors, and incomplete magnetic shielding.

To obtain clearer results, in 1969 Cohen built an elaborate shielded room at MIT, but still needed a more sensitive detector. James Zimmerman had just developed an extremely sensitive detector called the SQUID (Superconducting Quantum Interference Device). Cohen and Zimmerman set up this detector in the new room, to look at the body's heart signal, the MCG. For the first time the signals were now clear, and their resulting report, called the magna carta of biomagnetism, ushered in a new era in biomagnetism, attracting other researchers. Cohen then measured the first clear MEG, and signals from other organs. As interest rapidly grew, other laboratories also produced new recordings. Today, most biomagnetic measurements are of the human brain (MEG); these are made in a shielded room, using a helmet over the head containing hundreds of SQUIDs. There are perhaps 200 such MEG systems in existence, worldwide.

Cohen continuously worked in biomagnetism, authored many publications, mostly concerning the MEG, and has been called "the father of the MEG". He remains active in 2017, is on the faculty at the Harvard Medical School, and is a mentor in the MEG group at MIT's Martinos Center, located at Massachusetts General Hospital.

== See also ==
- James Edward Zimmerman
- Magnetocardiography
- Magnetoencephalography
- Magnetomyography
- Hosaka-Cohen Transformation
- Biomagnetism
