= Hosaka–Cohen transformation =

Hosaka–Cohen transformation (also called H–C transformation) is a mathematical method of converting a particular two-dimensional scalar magnetic field map to a particular two-dimensional vector map. The scalar field map is of the component of magnetic field which is normal to a two-dimensional surface of a volume conductor; this volume conductor contains the currents producing the magnetic field. The resulting vector map, sometimes called "an arrowmap" roughly mimics those currents under the surface which are parallel to the surface, which produced the field. Therefore, the purpose in performing the transformation is to allow a rough visualization of the underlying, parallel currents.

The transformation was proposed by Cohen and Hosaka of the biomagnetism group at MIT, then was used by Hosaka and Cohen to visualize the current sources of the magnetocardiogram.

Each arrow is defined as:

$$\vec{a} = {\partial Bz\over\partial y}\hat{x} - {\partial Bz\over\partial x}\hat{y}$$

where $x$ of the local $x, y, z$ coordinate system is normal to the volume conductor surface, $\hat{x}$ and $\hat{y}$ are unit vectors, and $Bz$ is the normal component of magnetic field. This is a form of two-dimensional gradient of the scalar quantity $Bz$ and is rotated by 90° from the conventional gradient.

Almost any scalar field, magnetic or otherwise, can be displayed in this way, if desired, as an aid to the eye, to help see the underlying sources of the field.

== See also ==
- Biomagnetism
- Bioelectromagnetism
- Electrophysiology
- Magnetic field
- Magnetocardiography
- Magnetometer
