= SPMR =

SPMR may refer to:

- Santa Maria Airport (Peru), ICAO code
- S.P.M.R. Commerce College, Jammu, see List of colleges affiliated to the University of Jammu
- Subpostmaster
- Superparamagnetic relaxometry
