= Superparamagnetic relaxometry =

Nanoscale magnetic measurement

Superparamagnetic relaxometry (SPMR) is a technology combining the use of sensitive magnetic sensors and the superparamagnetic properties of magnetite nanoparticles (NP). For NP of a sufficiently small size, on the order of tens of nanometers (nm), the NP exhibit paramagnetic properties, i.e., they have little or no magnetic moment. When they are exposed to a small external magnetic field, on the order of a few millitesla (mT), the NP align with that field and exhibit ferromagnetic properties with large magnetic moments. Following removal of the magnetizing field, the NP slowly become thermalized, decaying with a distinct time constant from the ferromagnetic state back to the paramagnetic state. This time constant depends strongly upon the NP diameter and whether they are unbound or bound to an external surface such as a cell. Measurement of this decaying magnetic field is typically done by superconducting quantum interference detectors (SQUIDs). The magnitude of the field during the decay process determines the magnetic moment of the NPs in the source. A spatial contour map of the field distribution determines the location of the source in three dimensions as well as the magnetic moment.

== Superparamagnetic nanoparticles for SPMR applications ==
SPMR measurements depend on the characteristics of the nanoparticle (NP) that is used. The NP must have the property that the bulk material is normally ferromagnetic in the bulk. Magnetite (Fe_{3}O_{4}) is one such example as it is ferromagnetic when below its Curie temperature. However, if the NPs are single domain, and of a size less than ~ 50 nm, they exhibit paramagnetic properties even below the Curie temperature due to the energy of the NP being dominated by thermal activity rather than magnetic energy. If an external magnetic field is applied, the NPs align with that field and have a magnetic moment now characteristic of ferromagnetic behavior. When this external field is removed, the NPs relax back to their paramagnetic state.

The size of the NP determines the rate of decay of the relaxation process after the extinction of the external magnetization field. The NP decay rate also depends on whether the particle is bound (tethered) to a surface, or is free to rotate. The latter case is dominated by thermal activity, Brownian motion.

For the bound case, the decay rate is given by the Néel equation

$$\tau^{}_N = \tau^{}_{0} \exp( K V / k_\text{B} T )$$

Here the value of τ_{0} is normally taken as τ_{0} ≈ 10^{−10} s, K is the anisotropy energy density of the magnetic material (1.35×10^{4} J/m^{3}), V the magnetic core volume, k_{B} is the Boltzmann constant, and T is the absolute temperature. This exponential relationship between the particle volume and the decay time implies a very strong dependence on the diameter of the NP used in SPMR studies, requiring precise size restrictions on producing these particles.

For magnetite, this requires a particle diameter of ~ 25 nm. The NP also require high monodispersity around this diameter as NP a few nm below this value will decay too fast and a few nanometres above will decay too slowly to fit into the time window of the measurement.

The value of the time constant, τ_{N}, depends on the method of fabrication of the NP. Different chemical procedures will produce slightly different values as well as different NP magnetic moments. Equally important characteristics of the NP are monodispersity, single domain character, and crystalline structure.

== Magnetizing field and magnetic sensors ==
A system of magnetic coils are used for magnetizing the NP during SPMR measurements such as those used for medical research applications. The subject of investigation may be living cell cultures, animals, or humans. The optimum magnitude of the magnetizing field will saturate the NP magnetic moment, although physical coil size and electrical constraints may be the limiting factor.

The use of magnetizing fields that provide a uniform field across the subject in one direction is desirable, as it reduces the number of variables when solving the inverse electromagnetic problem to determine the coordinates of NP sources in the sample. A uniform magnetizing field may be obtained with the use of Helmholtz coils.

The magnetizing field is applied for a sufficient time to allow the NP dipole moment to reach its maximum value. This field is then rapidly turned off > 1 msec, followed by a short duration to allow for any induced currents from the magnetizing field pulse to die away. Following this, the sensors are turned on and measure the decaying field for a sufficient time to obtain an accurate value of the decay time constant; 1–3 s. Magnetizing fields of ~ 5 mT for a Helmholtz coil of 1 m in diameter are used.

The magnetic sensors that measure the decaying magnetic fields require high magnetic field sensitivity in order to determine magnetic moments of NP with adequate sensitivity. SQUID sensors, similar to those used in magnetoencephalography are appropriate for this task. Atomic magnetometers also have adequate sensitivity.

Unshielded environments reduce expense and provide greater flexibility in location of the equipment but limit the sensitivity of the measurement to ~ 1 pT. This is offset by reducing the effect of external electromagnetic noise with noise reduction algorithms.

A contour map of the decaying magnetic fields is used to localize the sources containing bound NP. This map is produced from the field distribution obtained from an array of SQUID sensors, multiple positions of the sources under the sensors, or a combination of both. The magnetic moments of the sources is obtained during this procedure.

== Magnetic field decay of bound particles ==
The time of the NP decaying magnetic field for bound particles in SPMR measurements is on the order of seconds. Unbound particles of similar size decay on the order of milliseconds, contributing very little to the results.

The decay curve for bound NP is fit by an equation of the form

$$F-a_0+a_1\ln(1+a_2/t)+a_3\exp(-t/a_4)$$

or

$$F=a_0+a_1\exp(-t/a_2)+a_3\exp(-t/a_4)$$

The constants are fit to the experimental data and a particular time point is used to extract the value of the magnetic field. The fields from all the sensor positions are then used to construct a field contour map.

== Localization of sources—the inverse problem ==
Localization of magnetic sources producing the SPMR fields is done by solving the inverse problem of electromagnetism. The forward electromagnetic problem consists of modeling the sources as magnetic dipoles for each magnetic source or more complex configurations that model each source as a distributed source. Examples of the latter are multiple models, Bayesian models, or distributed dipole models. The magnetic dipole model has the form

$$\mathbf{B}( \mathbf{r} ) =
\frac{\mu_{0}}{4\pi}
\frac{ 3 \hat{\mathbf{n}}( \mathbf{p} \cdot \hat{\mathbf{n}} ) - \mathbf{p} }{n^3}
,
\qquad
\text{where}
\quad
\mathbf{n} = \mathbf{r} - \mathbf{r}_{0},
\quad
\hat{\mathbf{n}} = \frac{\mathbf{n}}{n},
\quad
n = \left\vert \mathbf{n} \right\vert,$$

where r_{0} and p are the location and dipole moment vectors of the magnetic dipole, and $\mu_{0}$ is the magnetic permeability of free space.

For a subject containing N_{p} sources, a minimum of 4N_{p} measurements of the magnetic field are required to determine the coordinates and magnetic moment of each source. In the case where the particles have been aligned by the external magnetizing field in a particular orientation, 3N_{p} measurements are required to obtain solutions. This latter situation leads to increased accuracy for finding the locations of objects as fewer variables are required in the inverse solution algorithm. Increased number of measurements provides an over-determined solution, increasing the localization accuracy.

Solving the inverse problem for magnetic dipole or more complex models is performed with nonlinear algorithms. The Levenberg-Marquardt algorithm is one approach to obtaining solutions to this non-linear problem. More complex methods are available from other biomagnetism programs.

Coordinates and magnetic moments, for each source assumed to be present in the sample, are determined from solution of the inverse problem.

== Functionalized NP and biological cells ==
One application of SPMR is the detection of disease and cancer. This is accomplished by functionalizing the NP with biomarkers, including cell antibodies (Ab). The functionalized NP+Ab may be subsequently attached to cells targeted by the biomarker in cell cultures, blood and marrow samples, as well as animal models.

A variety of biochemical procedures are used to conjugate the NP with the biomarker. The resulting NP+Ab are either directly mixed with incubated blood or diseased cells, or injected into animals. Following injection the functionalized NP reside in the bloodstream until encountering cells that are specific to the biomarker attached to the Ab.

Conjugation of NP with Ab followed by attachment to cells is accomplished by identifying particular cell lines expressing varying levels of the Ab by flow cytometry. The Ab is conjugated to the superparamagnetic iron oxide NP by different methods including the carbodiimide method. The conjugated NP+Ab are then incubated with the cell lines and may be examined by transmission-electron microscopy (TEM) to confirm that the NP+Ab are attached to the cells. Other methods to determine whether NP are present on the surface of the cell are confocal microscopy, Prussian blue histochemistry, and SPMR. The resulting carboxylate functionality of the polymer-encapsulated NPs by this method allows conjugation of amine groups on the Ab to the carboxylate anions on the surface of the NPs using standard two-step EDC/NHS chemistry.
