= Magnetomyography =

Magnetomyography (MMG) is a technique for mapping muscle activity by recording magnetic fields produced by electrical currents occurring naturally in the muscles, using arrays of SQUIDs (superconducting quantum interference devices). It has a better capability than electromyography for detecting slow or direct currents. The magnitude of the MMG signal is in the scale of pico (10^−12) to femto (10^−15) tesla (T). Miniaturizing MMG offers a prospect to modernize the bulky SQUID to wearable miniaturized magnetic sensors.

Two key drivers for the development of the MMG method: 1) poor spatial resolution of the EMG signals when recorded non-invasively on the skin where state-of-the-art EMG measurements are even using needle recording probes, which is possible to accurately assess muscle activity but painful and limited to tiny areas with poor spatial sampling points; 2) poor biocompatibility of the implantable EMG sensors due to the metal-tissue interface. The MMG sensors have the potential to address both shortcomings concurrently because: 1) the size of magnetic field reduces significantly with the distance between the origin and the sensor, thereby with MMG spatial resolution is uplifted; and 2) the MMG sensors do not need electrical contacts to record, hence if fully packaged with biocompatible materials or polymers, they can improve long-term biocompatibility.

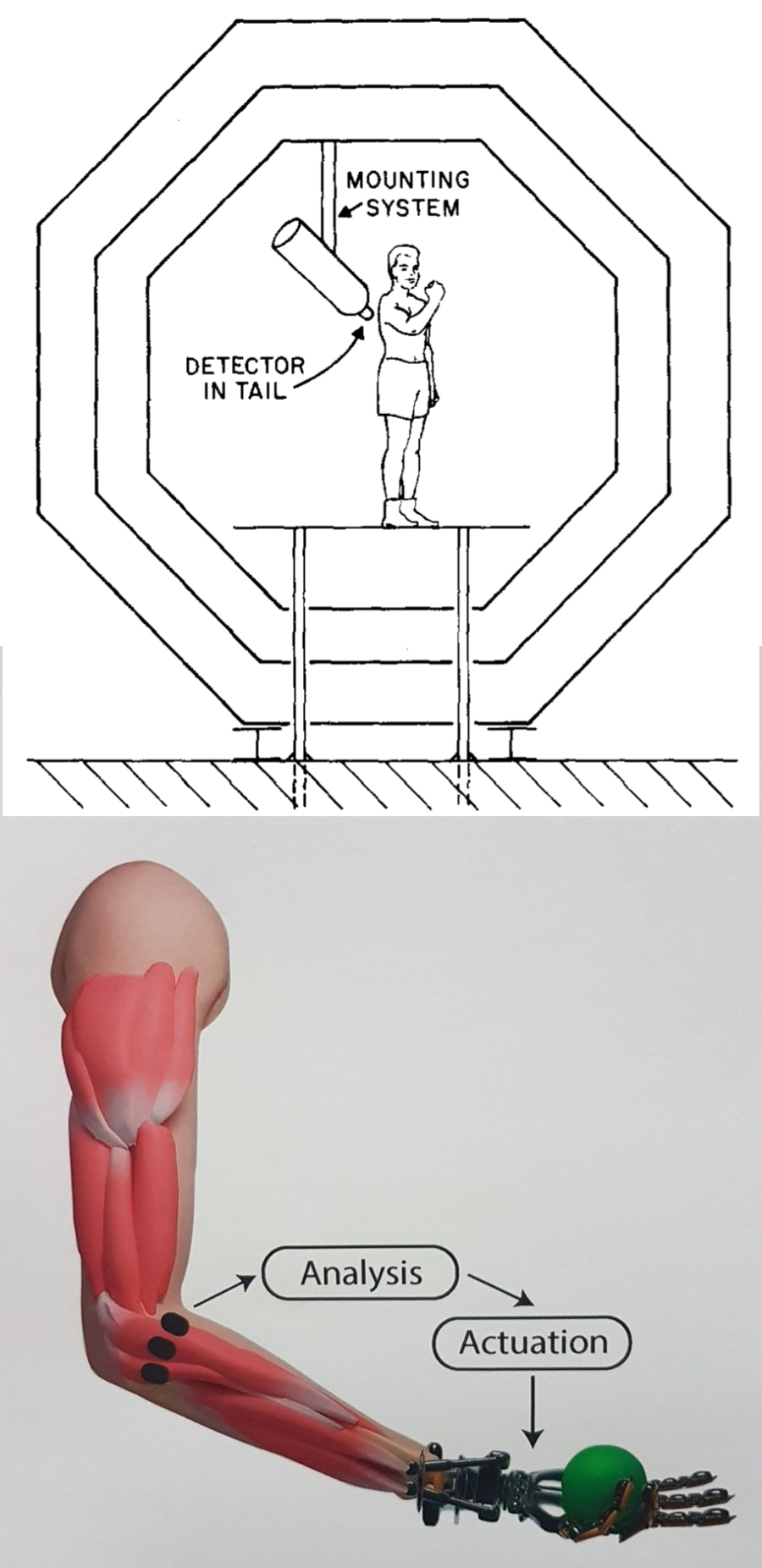
MMG using conventional SQUIDs[1] (top) and miniaturised implantable magnetic sensors[2] (bottom).

== History ==
At the early 18th century, the electric signals from living tissues have been investigated. These researchers have promoted many innovations in healthcare especially in medical diagnostic. Some example is based on electrical signals produced by human tissues, including Electrocardiogram (ECG), Electroencephalography (EEG) and Electromyogram (EMG). Besides, with the development of technologies, the biomagnetic measurement from the human body, consisting of Magnetocardiogram (MCG), Magnetoencephalography (MEG) and Magnetomyogram (MMG), provided clear evidence that the existence of the magnetic fields from ionic action currents in electrically active tissues can be utilized to record activities. For the first attempt, David Cohen used a point-contact superconducting quantum interference device (SQUID) magnetometer in a shielded room to measure the MCG. They reported that the sensitivity of the recorded MCG was orders of magnitude higher than the previously recorded MCG. The same researcher continued this MEG measurement by using a more sensitive SQUID magnetometer without noise averaging. He compared the EEG and alpha rhythm MEG recorded by both normal and abnormal subjects. It is shown that the MEG has produced some new and different information provided by the EEG. Because the heart can produce a relatively large magnetic field compared to the brain and other organs, the early biomagnetic field research originated from the mathematical modelling of MCG. Early experimental studies also focused on the MCG. In addition, these experimental studies suffer from unavoidable low spatial resolution and low sensitivity due to the lack of sophisticated detection methods. With advances in technology, research has expanded into brain function, and preliminary studies of evoked MEGs began in the 1980s. These studies provided some details about which neuronal populations were contributing to the magnetic signals generated from the brain. However, the signals from single neurons were too weak to be detected. A group of over 10,000 dendrites is required as a group to generate a detectable MEG signal. At the time, the abundance of physical, technical, and mathematical limitations prevented quantitative comparisons of theories and experiments involving human electrocardiograms and other biomagnetic records. Due to the lack of an accurate micro source model, it is more difficult to determine which specific physiological factors influence the strength of MEG and other biomagnetic signals and which factors dominate the achievable spatial resolution. In the past three decades, a great deal of research has been conducted to measure and analyze the magnetic field generated by the flow of ex vivo currents in isolated axons and muscle fibers. These measurements have been supported by some complex theoretical studies and the development of ultra-sensitive room temperature amplifiers and neuromagnetic current probes. Nowadays, cell-level magnetic recording technology has become a quantitative measurement technique for operating currents.

Nowadays, the MMG signals can become an important indicator in medical diagnosis, rehabilitation, health monitoring and robotics control. Recent advances in technology have paved the way to remotely and continuously record and diagnosis individuals’ disease of the muscle and the peripheral nerve. Motivated by exploring the electrophysiological behavior of the uterus prior to childbirth, MMG was used mainly on health monitoring during pregnancy. In addition, the MMG has the potential to be used in the rehabilitation such as the traumatic nerve injury, spinal cord lesion, and entrapment syndrome.

== Miniaturized MMG ==
The magnitude of the MMG signals is lower than that of the heart and the brain. The minimum spectral density could reach limit of detection (LOD) of hundreds of fT/√Hz at low frequencies especially between 10 Hz and 100 Hz. In a seminal work of Cohen and Gilver in 1972, they discovered and recorded MMG signals using Superconducting QUantum Interference Devices (SQUIDs). They led the development of MMG until now since it is the most sensitive device at moment with the femtotesla limit of detection (LOD), and possibly achieve attotesla LOD with averaging. The state-of-the-art MMG measurement is dominated by SQUIDs. Nonetheless, their ultra-high cost and cumbersome weight limit the spread of this magnetic sensing technique. In the last several years, optically pumped magnetometers (OPMs) have been rapidly developed to study the innervation of the hand nerves and muscles as proof-of-concept investigations. The OPMs with small physical size have been improved their LODs significantly during recent years, especially from competing manufacturers e.g. QuSpin Inc., FieldLine Inc. and Twinleaf. Below 100 fT/√Hz sensitivity has been achieved with OPMs. The MMG has not been a common method yet mainly due to its small magnitude, which can be easily affected by the magnetic noise in surrounding. For instance, the amplitude of the Earth magnetic field is about five million times larger and environmental noise from power lines can reach a level of nanotesla. Additionally, current experiments based on SQUIDs and OPMs for MMG sensing are conducted in heavily shielded rooms, which are expensive and bulky for personal daily use. Consequently, the development of miniaturised, low-cost and room temperature biomagnetic sensing methods would constitute an important step towards the wider appreciation of biomagnetism.

A high-performance Hall sensor has been successfully performed with its integrated readout circuit in CMOS technology. However, Hall sensors require a highly stable DC power supply to excite the Hall effect and a complex interface circuit to process collected weak Hall voltages under surrounding noise. Recently miniaturised tunneling magnetoresistive sensors as well as magnetoelectric sensors have been proposed for the future of the MMG in the form of wearable devices. They are CMOS compatible and their sensor output can be readout by an analogue front-end. The miniaturized TMR sensor could be an effective alternative for future MMG measurements with relatively low operating costs.

== See also ==
- Magnetoencephalography
- Magnetocardiography
- Electromyography
- Biomagnetism
