= Lia Krusin-Elbaum =

American physicist

Lia Krusin-Elbaum is a physicist whose research studies the design, fabrication, and electrochemical properties of complex nanostructures including nano-scale quantum electronics, superconductors, spintronics, and topological insulators. She is a professor of physics at the City College of New York.

== Education and career ==
Krusin-Elbaum completed her Ph.D. at New York University in 1979. Her dissertation, Magnetic properties of aluminosilicate glasses in very weak magnetic fields, was supervised by Samuel J. Williamson.

She came to work for IBM at the Thomas J. Watson Research Center as a postdoctoral researcher in 1979, and in 1981 she became a permanent research staff member there. She was head of the complex materials research team from 1989 until 2009; in 2010 she moved to her present position as a professor at the City College of New York.

== Recognition ==
Krusin-Elbaum was elected as a Fellow of the American Physical Society (APS) in 1993, after a nomination from the APS Division of Condensed Matter Physics, "for fundamental work on the magnetic properties of high temperature superconductors".
