= Biomagnetism =

Magnetic fields produced by organisms

Biomagnetism is the phenomenon of magnetic fields produced by living organisms; it is a subset of bioelectromagnetism. In contrast, organisms' use of magnetism in navigation is magnetoception and the study of the magnetic fields' effects on organisms is magnetobiology. (The word biomagnetism has also been used loosely to include magnetobiology, further encompassing almost any combination of the words magnetism, cosmology, and biology, such as "magnetoastrobiology".)

The origin of the word biomagnetism is unclear, but seems to have appeared several hundred years ago, linked to the expression "animal magnetism". The present scientific definition took form in the 1970s, when an increasing number of researchers began to measure the magnetic fields produced by the human body. The first valid measurement was actually made in 1963, but the field of research began to expand only after a low-noise technique was developed in 1970. Today the community of biomagnetic researchers does not have a formal organization, but international conferences are held every two years, with about 600 attendees. Most conference activity centers on the MEG (magnetoencephalogram), the measurement of the magnetic field of the brain.

== Prominent researchers ==
- David Cohen
- John Wikswo
- Samuel Williamson

== See also ==
- Bioelectrochemistry
- Human magnetism
- Magnetite
- Magnetocardiography
- Magnetoception - sensing of magnetic fields by organisms
- Magnetoelectrochemistry
- Magnetoencephalography
- Magnetogastrography
- Magnetomyography
- SQUID
