= Scanning SQUID microscopy =

Method of imaging magnetic fields at microscopic scales

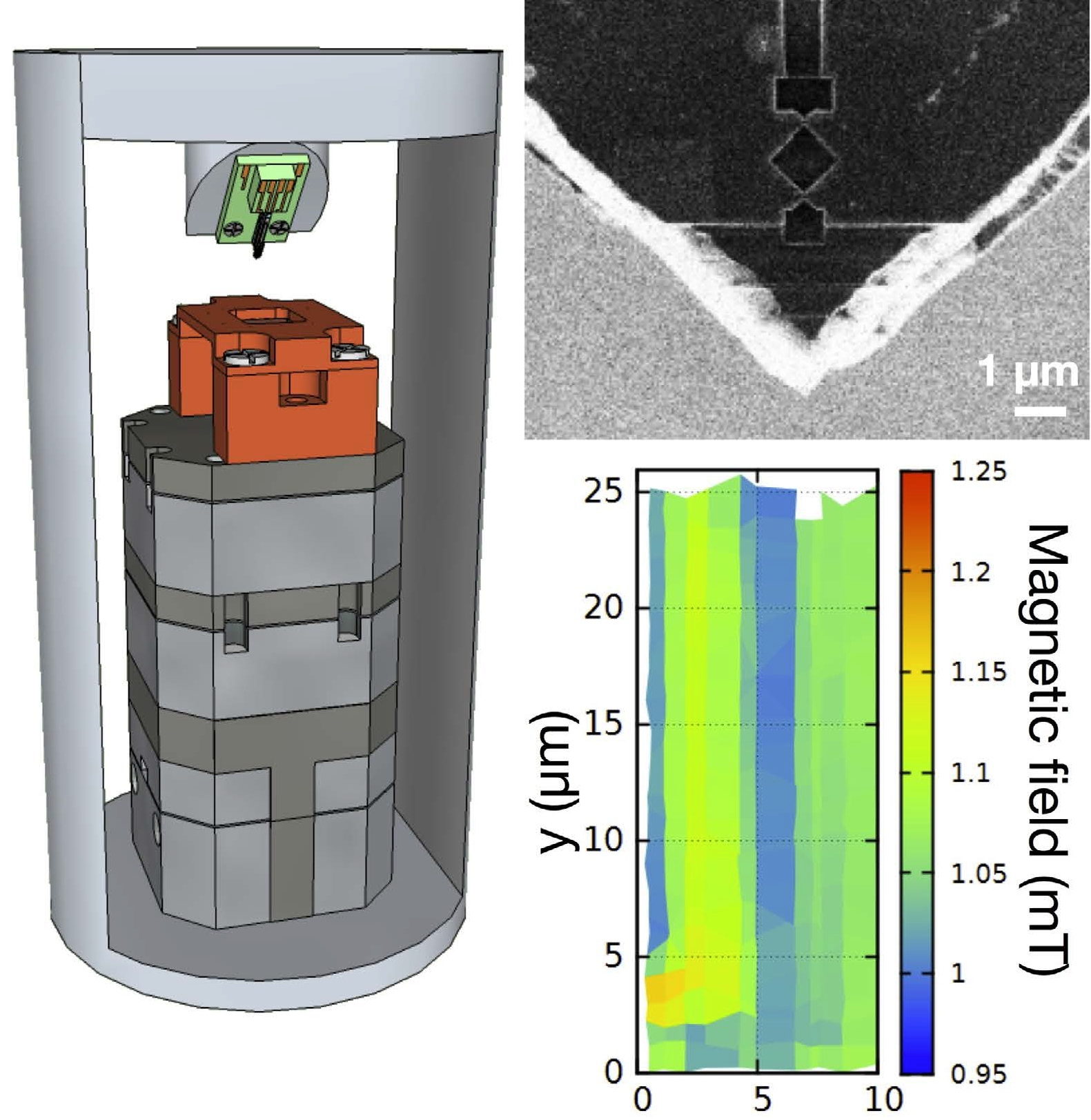
Left: Schematic of a scanning SQUID microscope in a helium-4 refrigerator. Green holder for the SQUID probe is attached to a quartz tuning fork. Bottom part is a piezoelectric sample stage. Right: electron micrograph of a SQUID probe and a test image of Nb/Au strips recorded with it.

In condensed matter physics, scanning SQUID microscopy is a technique where a superconducting quantum interference device (SQUID) is used to image surface magnetic field strength with micrometre-scale resolution. A tiny SQUID is mounted onto a tip which is then rastered near the surface of the sample to be measured. As the SQUID is the most sensitive detector of magnetic fields available and can be constructed at submicrometre widths via lithography, the scanning SQUID microscope allows magnetic fields to be measured with unparalleled resolution and sensitivity. The first scanning SQUID microscope was built in 1992 by Black et al. Since then the technique has been used to confirm unconventional superconductivity in several high-temperature superconductors including YBCO and BSCCO compounds.

== Operating principles ==
Diagram of a DC SQUID. The current $I$ enters and splits into the two paths, each with currents $I_a$ and $I_b$. The thin barriers on each path are Josephson junctions, which together separate the two superconducting regions. $\Phi$ represents the magnetic flux entering the inside of the DC SQUID loop.

The scanning SQUID microscope is based upon the thin-film DC SQUID. A DC SQUID consists of superconducting electrodes in a ring pattern connected by two weak-link Josephson junctions (see figure). Above the critical current of the Josephson junctions, the idealized difference in voltage between the electrodes is given by

$$\begin{align}
V &= \frac{R}{2}\sqrt{I^2 - I_0^2},\\
&= \frac{R}{2}\left(I^2 - \left( 2I_c\cos\left(\pi\frac{\Phi}{\Phi_0}\right)\right)^2 \right)^\frac{1}{2},
\end{align}$$

where R is the resistance between the electrodes, I is the current, I_{0} is the maximum supercurrent, I_{c} is the critical current of the Josephson junctions, Φ is the total magnetic flux through the ring, and Φ_{0} is the magnetic flux quantum.

Hence, a DC SQUID can be used as a flux-to-voltage transducer. However, as noted by the figure, the voltage across the electrodes oscillates sinusoidally with respect to the amount of magnetic flux passing through the device. As a result, alone a SQUID can only be used to measure the change in magnetic field from some known value, unless the magnetic field or device size is very small such that Φ < Φ_{0}. To use the DC SQUID to measure standard magnetic fields, one must either count the number of oscillations in the voltage as the field is changed, which is very difficult in practice, or use a separate DC bias magnetic field parallel to the device to maintain a constant voltage and consequently constant magnetic flux through the loop. The strength of the field being measured will then be equal to the strength of the bias magnetic field passing through the SQUID.

Although it is possible to read the DC voltage between the two terminals of the SQUID directly, because noise tends to be a problem in DC measurements, an alternating current technique is used. In addition to the DC bias magnetic field, an AC magnetic field of constant amplitude, with field strength generating Φ << Φ_{0}, is also emitted in the bias coil. This AC field produces an AC voltage with amplitude proportional to the DC component in the SQUID. The advantage of this technique is that the frequency of the voltage signal can be chosen to be far away from that of any potential noise sources. By using a lock-in amplifier the device can read only the frequency corresponding to the magnetic field, ignoring many other sources of noise.

== Instrumentation ==
A Scanning SQUID Microscope is a sensitive near-field imaging system for the measurement of weak magnetic fields by moving a Superconducting Quantum Interference Device (SQUID) across an area. The microscope can map out buried current-carrying wires by measuring the magnetic fields produced by the currents, or can be used to image fields produced by magnetic materials. By mapping out the current in an integrated circuit or a package, short circuits can be localized and chip designs can be verified to see that current is flowing where expected.

As the SQUID material must be superconducting, measurements must be performed at low temperatures. Typically, experiments are carried out below liquid helium temperature (4.2 K) in a helium-3 refrigerator or dilution refrigerator. However, advances in high-temperature superconductor thin-film growth have allowed relatively inexpensive liquid nitrogen cooling to instead be used. It is even possible to measure room-temperature samples by only cooling a high T_{c} squid and maintaining thermal separation with the sample. In either case, due to the extreme sensitivity of the SQUID probe to stray magnetic fields, in general some form of magnetic shielding is used. Most common is a shield made of mu-metal, possibly in combination with a superconducting "can" (all superconductors repel magnetic fields via the Meissner effect).

The actual SQUID probe is generally made via thin-film deposition with the SQUID area outlined via lithography. A wide variety of superconducting materials can be used, but the two most common are Niobium, due to its relatively good resistance to damage from thermal cycling, and YBCO, for its high T_{c} > 77 K and relative ease of deposition compared to other high T_{c} superconductors. In either case, a superconductor with critical temperature higher than that of the operating temperature should be chosen. The SQUID itself can be used as the pickup coil for measuring the magnetic field, in which case the resolution of the device is proportional to the size of the SQUID. However, currents in or near the SQUID generate magnetic fields which are then registered in the coil and can be a source of noise. To reduce this effect it is also possible to make the size of the SQUID itself very small, but attach the device to a larger external superconducting loop located far from the SQUID. The flux through the loop will then be detected and measured, inducing a voltage in the SQUID.

The resolution and sensitivity of the device are both proportional to the size of the SQUID. A smaller device will have greater resolution but less sensitivity. The change in voltage induced is proportional to the inductance of the device, and limitations in the control of the bias magnetic field as well as electronics issues prevent a perfectly constant voltage from being maintained at all times. However, in practice, the sensitivity in most scanning SQUID microscopes is sufficient for almost any SQUID size for many applications, and therefore the tendency is to make the SQUID as small as possible to enhance resolution. Via e-beam lithography techniques it is possible to fabricate devices with total area of 1–10 μm^{2}, although devices in the tens to hundreds of square micrometres are more common.

The SQUID itself is mounted onto a cantilever and operated either in direct contact with or just above the sample surface. The position of the SQUID is usually controlled by some form of electric stepping motor. Depending on the particular application, different levels of precision may be required in the height of the apparatus. Operating at lower-tip sample distances increases the sensitivity and resolution of the device, but requires more advanced mechanisms in controlling the height of the probe. In addition such devices require extensive vibration dampening if precise height control is to be maintained.

=== High temperature scanning SQUID microscope ===
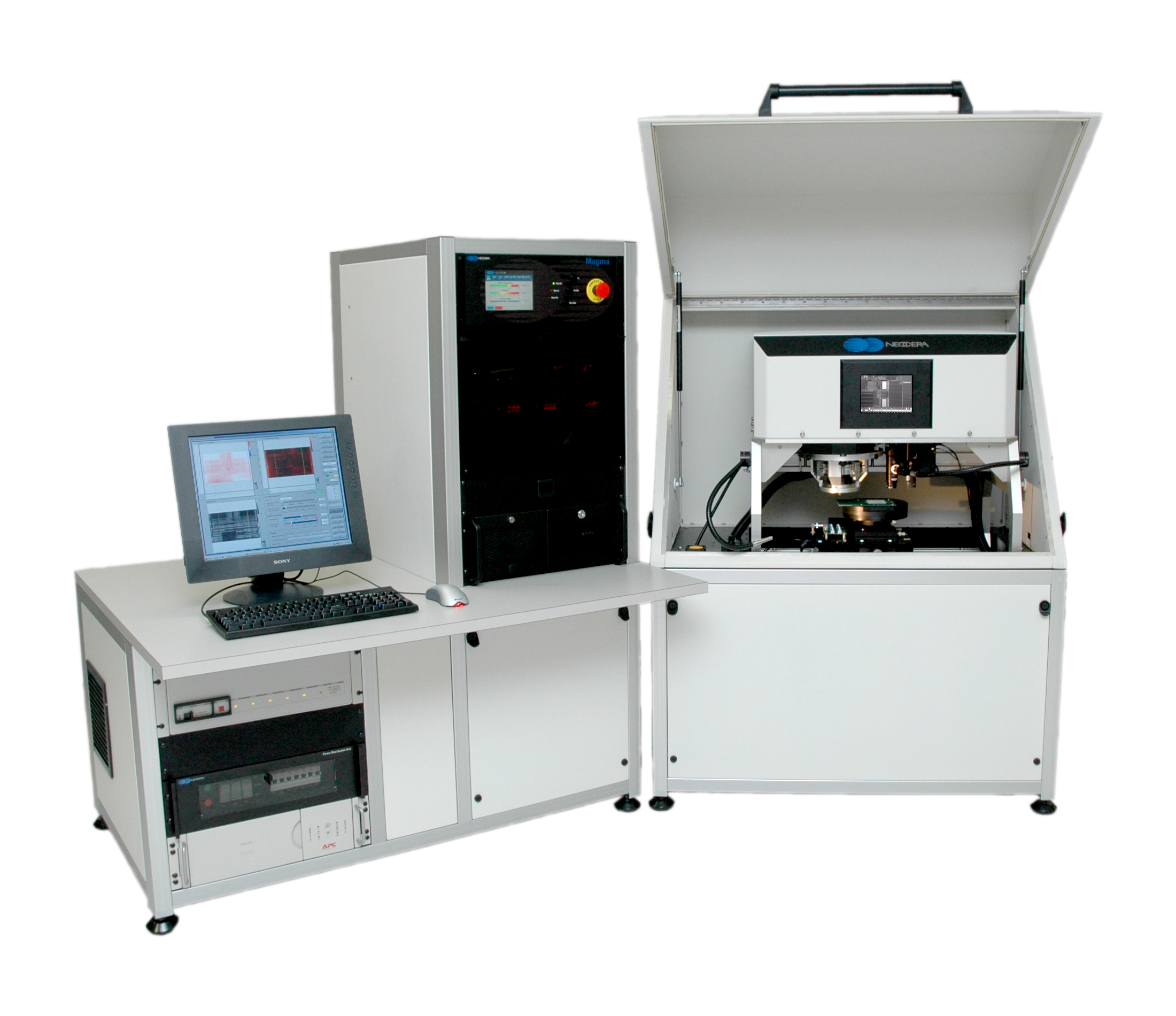
Scanning SQUID microscope

A high temperature Scanning SQUID Microscope using a YBCO SQUID is capable of measuring magnetic fields as small as 20 pT (about 2 million times weaker than the Earth's magnetic field). The SQUID sensor is sensitive enough that it can detect a wire even if it is carrying only 10 nA of current at a distance of 100 μm from the SQUID sensor with 1 second averaging. The microscope uses a patented design to allow the sample under investigation to be at room temperature and in air while the SQUID sensor is under vacuum and cooled to less than 80 K using a cryo cooler. No Liquid Nitrogen is used. During non-contact, non-destructive imaging of room temperature samples in air, the system achieves a raw, unprocessed spatial resolution equal to the distance separating the sensor from the current or the effective size of the sensor, whichever is larger. To best locate a wire short in a buried layer, however, a Fast Fourier Transform (FFT) back-evolution technique can be used to transform the magnetic field image into an equivalent map of the current in an integrated circuit or printed wiring board. The resulting current map can then be compared to a circuit diagram to determine the fault location. With this post-processing of a magnetic image and the low noise present in SQUID images, it is possible to enhance the spatial resolution by factors of 5 or more over the near-field limited magnetic image. The system's output is displayed as a false-color image of magnetic field strength or current magnitude (after processing) versus position on the sample. After processing to obtain current magnitude, this microscope has been successful at locating shorts in conductors to within ±16 μm at a sensor-current distance of 150 μm.

== Operation ==
Figure 1: Electrical schematic of a SQUID where I_{b} is the bias current, I_{0} is the critical current of the SQUID, Φ is the flux threading the SQUID and V is the voltage response to that flux.

Figure 2 a) Plot of current vs. voltage for a SQUID. Upper and lower curves correspond to nΦ_{0} and (n+1/2)Φ_{0} respectively. Figure 2 b) Periodic voltage response due to flux through a SQUID. The periodicity is equal to one flux quantum, Φ_{0}

Operation of a scanning SQUID microscope consists of simply cooling down the probe and sample, and rastering the tip across the area where measurements are desired. As the change in voltage corresponding to the measured magnetic field is quite rapid, the strength of the bias magnetic field is typically controlled by feedback electronics. This field strength is then recorded by a computer system that also keeps track of the position of the probe. An optical camera can also be used to track the position of the SQUID with respect to the sample.

As the name implies, SQUIDs are made from superconducting material. As a result, they need to be cooled to cryogenic temperatures of less than 90 K (liquid nitrogen temperatures) for high temperature SQUIDs and less than 9 K (liquid helium temperatures) for low temperature SQUIDs. For magnetic current imaging systems, a small (about 30 μm wide) high temperature SQUID is used. This system has been designed to keep a high temperature SQUID, made from YBa_{2}Cu_{3}O_{7}, cooled below 80K and in vacuum while the device under test is at room temperature and in air. A SQUID consists of two Josephson tunnel junctions that are connected together in a superconducting loop (see Figure 1). A Josephson junction is formed by two superconducting regions that are separated by a thin insulating barrier. Current exists in the junction without any voltage drop, up to a maximum value, called the critical current, I_{o}. When the SQUID is biased with a constant current that exceeds the critical current of the junction, then changes in the magnetic flux, Φ, threading the SQUID loop produce changes in the voltage drop across the SQUID (see Figure 1). Figure 2(a) shows the I-V characteristic of a SQUID where ∆V is the modulation depth of the SQUID due to external magnetic fields. The voltage across a SQUID is a nonlinear periodic function of the applied magnetic field, with a periodicity of one flux quantum, Φ_{0}=2.07×10^{−15} Tm^{2} (see Figure 2(b)). In order to convert this nonlinear response to a linear response, a negative feedback circuit is used to apply a feedback flux to the SQUID so as to keep the total flux through the SQUID constant. In such a flux locked loop, the magnitude of this feedback flux is proportional to the external magnetic field applied to the SQUID. Further description of the physics of SQUIDs and SQUID microscopy can be found elsewhere.

=== Magnetic field detection using SQUID ===
Magnetic current imaging uses the magnetic fields produced by currents in electronic devices to obtain images of those currents. This is accomplished through the fundamental physics relationship between magnetic fields and current, the Biot-Savart Law:

$$d\vec B=\frac{\mu_0}{4\pi}\frac{Id\vec l\times\vec r}{r^3} \, .$$
B is the magnetic induction, Idℓ is an element of the current, the constant μ_{0} is the permeability of free space, and r is the distance between the current and the sensor.

As a result, the current can be directly calculated from the magnetic field knowing only the separation between the current and the magnetic field sensor. The details of this mathematical calculation can be found elsewhere, but what is important to know here is that this is a direct calculation that is not influenced by other materials or effects, and that through the use of Fast Fourier Transforms these calculations can be performed very quickly. A magnetic field image can be converted to a current density image in about 1 or 2 seconds.

== Applications ==
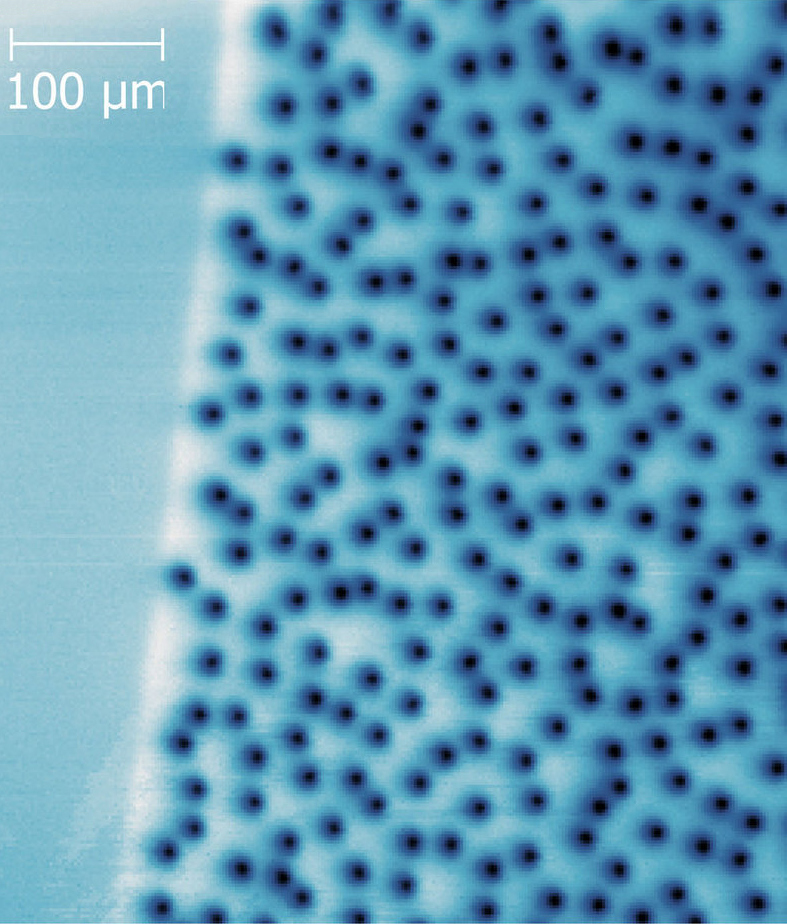
Quantum vortices in YBCO imaged by the scanning SQUID microscopy

The scanning SQUID microscope was originally developed for an experiment to test the pairing symmetry of the high-temperature cuprate superconductor YBCO. Standard superconductors are isotropic with respect to their superconducting properties, that is, for any direction of electron momentum $k$ in the superconductor, the magnitude of the order parameter and consequently the superconducting energy gap will be the same. However, in the high-temperature cuprate superconductors, the order parameter instead follows the equation $\Delta (k)=\Delta _0(cos(k_xa)-(k_ya))$, meaning that when crossing over any of the [110] directions in momentum space one will observe a sign change in the order parameter. The form of this function is equal to that of the l = 2 spherical harmonic function, giving it the name d-wave superconductivity. As the superconducting electrons are described by a single coherent wavefunction, proportional to exp(-iφ), where φ is known as the phase of the wavefunction, this property can be also interpreted as a phase shift of π under a 90 degree rotation.

This property was exploited by Tsuei et al. by manufacturing a series of YBCO ring Josephson junctions which crossed [110] Bragg planes of a single YBCO crystal (figure). In a Josephson junction ring the superconducting electrons form a coherent wave function, just as in a superconductor. As the wavefunction must have only one value at each point, the overall phase factor obtained after traversing the entire Josephson circuit must be an integer multiple of 2π, as otherwise, one would obtain a different value of the probability density depending on the number of times one traversed the ring.

In YBCO, upon crossing the [110] planes in momentum (and real) space, the wavefunction will undergo a phase shift of π. Hence if one forms a Josephson ring device where this plane is crossed (2n+1), number of times, a phase difference of (2n+1)π will be observed between the two junctions. For 2n, or even number of crossings, as in B, C, and D, a phase difference of (2n)π will be observed. Compared to the case of standard s-wave junctions, where no phase shift is observed, no anomalous effects were expected in the B, C, and D cases, as the single valued property is conserved, but for device A, the system must do something to for the φ=2nπ condition to be maintained. In the same property behind the scanning SQUID microscope, the phase of the wavefunction is also altered by the amount of magnetic flux passing through the junction, following the relationship Δφ=π(Φ_{0}). As was predicted by Sigrist and Rice, the phase condition can then be maintained in the junction by a spontaneous flux in the junction of value Φ_{0}/2.

Tsuei et al. used a scanning SQUID microscope to measure the local magnetic field at each of the devices in the figure, and observed a field in ring A approximately equal in magnitude Φ_{0}/2A, where A was the area of the ring. The device observed zero field at B, C, and D. The results provided one of the earliest and most direct experimental confirmations of d-wave pairing in YBCO.

Scanning SQUID Microscope can detect all types of shorts and conductive paths including Resistive Opens (RO) defects such as cracked or voided bumps, Delaminated Vias, Cracked traces/mouse bites and Cracked Plated Through Holes (PTH). It can map power distributions in packages as well as in 3D Integrated Circuits (IC) with Through-Silicon Via (TSV), System in package (SiP), Multi-Chip Module (MCM) and stacked die. SQUID scanning can also isolate defective components in assembled devices or Printed Circuit Board (PCB).

=== Short Localization in Advanced Wirebond Semiconductor Package ===
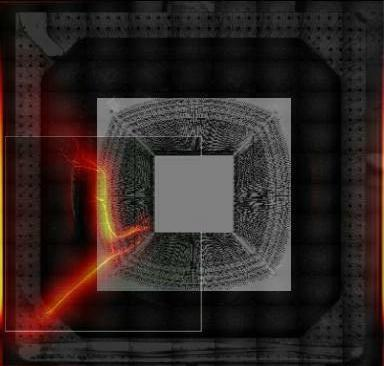
Current Image overlaid the optical image of the part and the layout of the part

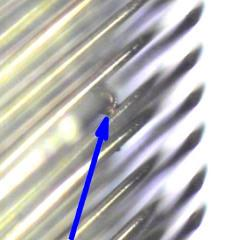
Optical image of the decapped wire bonds that are lifted from the die and touching another wire bond

Advanced wire-bond packages, unlike traditional Ball Grid Array (BGA) packages, have multiple pad rows on the die and multiple tiers on the substrate. This package technology has brought new challenges to failure analysis. To date, Scanning Acoustic Microscopy (SAM), Time Domain Reflectometry (TDR) analysis, and Real-Time X-ray (RTX) inspection were the non-destructive tools used to detect short faults. Unfortunately, these techniques do not work very well in advanced wire-bond packages. Because of the high density wire bonding in advanced wire-bond packages, it is extremely hard to localize the short with conventional RTX inspection. Without detailed information as to where the short might occur, attempting destructive decapsulation to expose both die surface and bond wires is full of risk. Wet chemical etching to remove mold compound in a large area often results in over-etching. Furthermore, even if the package is successfully decapped, visual inspection of the multi-tiered bond wires is a blind search.

The Scanning SQUID Microscopy (SSM) data are current density images and current peak images. The current density images give the magnitude of the current, while the current peak images reveal the current path with a ± 3 μm resolution. Obtaining the SSM data from scanning advanced wire-bond packages is only half the task; fault localization is still necessary. The critical step is to overlay the SSM current images or current path images with CAD files such as bonding diagrams or RTX images to pinpoint the fault location. To make alignment of overlaying possible, an optical two-point reference alignment is made. The package edge and package fiducial are the most convenient package markings to align to. Based on the data analysis, fault localization by SSM should isolate the short in the die, bond wires or package substrate. After all non-destructive approaches are exhausted, the final step is destructive deprocessing to verify SSM data. Depending on fault isolation, the deprocessing techniques include decapsulation, parallel lapping or cross-section.

=== Short in multi-stacked packages ===
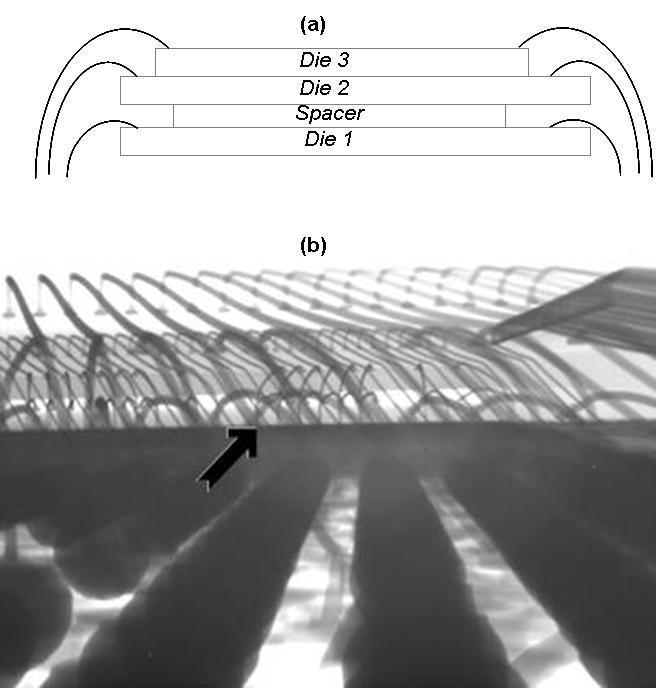
Figure 1(a) Schematic showing typical bond wires in a triple-stacked die package, Figure 1(b) X-ray lateral view of actual triple-stacked die package.

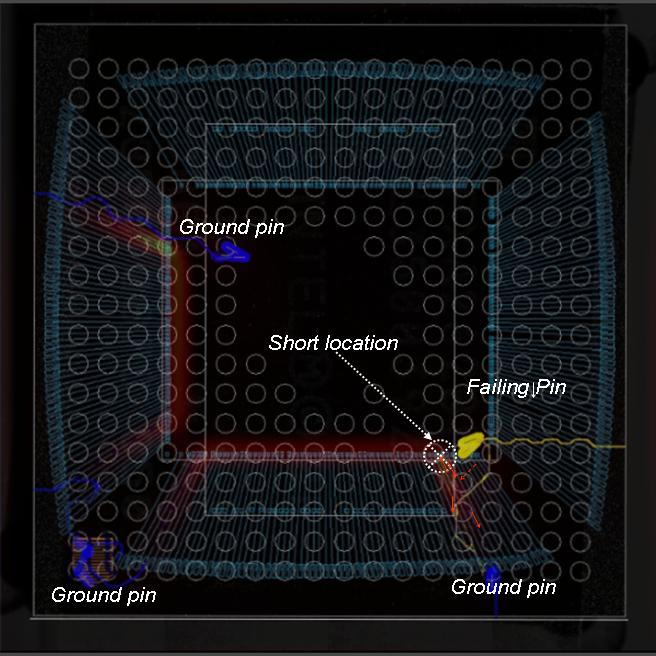
Figure 2: Overlay of current density, optical, and CAD images in triple-stacked die package with electric short failure mode.

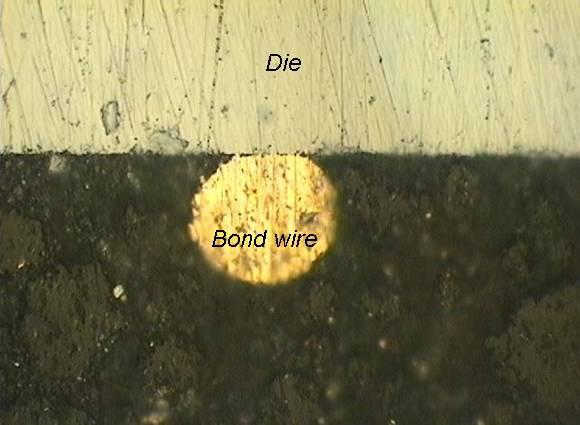
Figure 3: Cross sectional image showing a bond wire touching the die causing signal to ground leakage.

Electric shorts in multi-stacked die packages can be very difficult to isolate non-destructively; especially when a large number of bond wires are somehow shorted. For instance, when an electric short is produced by two bond wires touching each other, X-ray analysis may help to identify potential defect locations; however, defects like metal migration produced at wirebond pads, or bond wires somehow touching any other conductive structures, may be very difficult to catch with non-destructive techniques that are not electrical in nature. Here, the availability of analytical tools that can map out the flow of electric current inside the package provide valuable information to guide the failure analyst to potential defect locations.

Figure 1a shows the schematic of our first case study consisting of a triple-stacked die package. The X-ray image of figure 1b is intended to illustrate the challenge of finding the potential short locations represented for failure analysts. In particular, this is one of a set of units that were inconsistently failing and recovering under reliability tests. Time domain reflectometry and X-ray analysis were performed on these units with no success in isolating the defects. Also there was no clear indication of defects that could potentially produce the observed electrical short failure mode. Two of those units were analyzed with SSM.

Electrically connecting the failing pin to a ground pin produced the electric current path shown in figure 2. This electrical path strongly suggests that the current is somehow flowing through all the ground nets though a conductive path located very close to the wirebond pads from the top down view of the package. Based on electrical and layout analysis of the package, it can be inferred that current is either flowing through the wirebond pads or that the wirebonds are somehow touching a conductive structure at the specified location. After obtaining similar SSM results on the two units under test, further destructive analysis focused around the small potential short region, and it showed that the failing pin wirebond is touching the bottom of one of the stacked dice at the specific XY position highlighted by SSM analysis. The cross section view of one of those units is shown in figure 3.

A similar defect was found in the second unit.

=== Short between pins in molding compound package ===
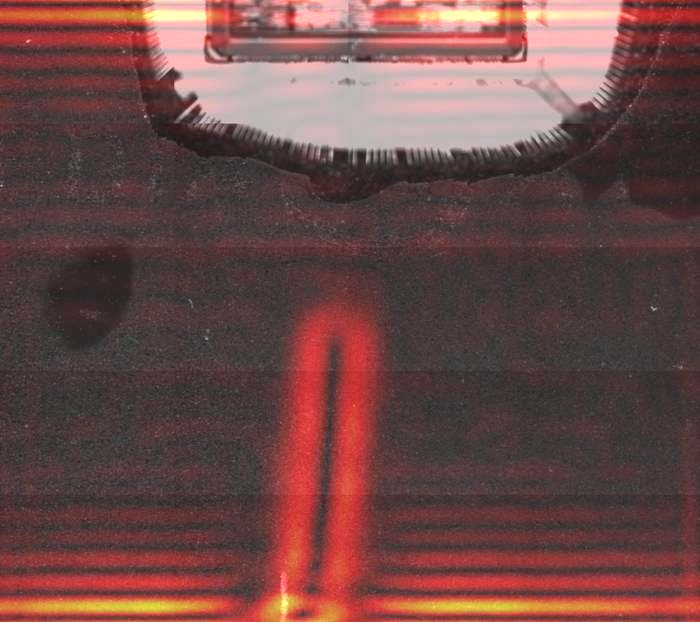
Figure 1 SQUID image of package indicating location of short.

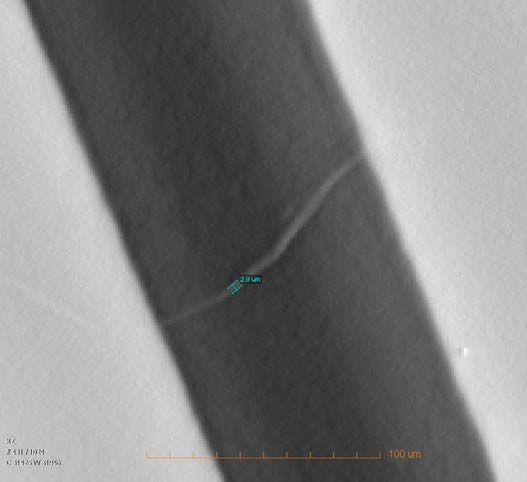
Figure 2: High-resolution radiographic image of filament, measured at 2.9 micrometres wide. Image shows filament running under both shorted leads.

The failure in this example was characterized as an eight-ohm short between two adjacent pins. The bond wires to the pins of interest were cut with no effect on the short as measured at the external pins, indicating that the short was present in the package. Initial attempts to identify the failure with conventional radiographic analysis were unsuccessful. Arguably the most difficult part of the procedure is identifying the physical location of the short with a high enough degree of confidence to permit destructive techniques to be used to reveal the shorting material. Fortunately, two analytical techniques are now available that can significantly increase the effectiveness of the fault localization process.

==== Superconducting Quantum Interference Device (SQUID) Detection ====
One characteristic that all shorts have in common is the movement of electrons from a high potential to a lower one. This physical movement of the electrical charge creates a small magnetic field around the electron. With enough electrons moving, the aggregate magnetic field can be detected by superconducting sensors. Instruments equipped with such sensors can follow the path of a short circuit along its course through a part. The SQUID detector has been used in failure analysis for many years, and is now commercially available for use at the package level. The ability of SQUID to track the flow of current provides a virtual roadmap of the short, including the location in plan view of the shorting material in a package. We used the SQUID facilities at Neocera to investigate the failure in the package of interest, with pins carrying 1.47 milliamps at 2 volts. SQUID analysis of the part revealed a clear current path between the two pins of interest, including the location of the conductive material that bridged the two pins. The SQUID scan of the part is shown in Figure 1.

==== Low-power radiography ====
The second fault location technique will be taken somewhat out of turn, as it was used to characterize this failure after the SQUID analysis, as an evaluation sample for an equipment vendor. The ability to focus and resolve low-power X-rays and detect their presence or absence has improved to the point that radiography can now be used to identify features heretofore impossible to detect. The equipment at Xradia was used to inspect the failure of interest in this analysis. An example of their findings is shown in Figure 2. The feature shown (which is also the material responsible for the failure) is a copper filament approximately three micrometres wide in cross-section, which was impossible to resolve in our in-house radiography equipment.

The principal drawback of this technique is that the depth of field is extremely short, requiring many 'cuts' on a given specimen to detect very small particles or filaments. At the high magnification required to resolve micrometre-sized features, the technique can become prohibitively expensive in both time and money to perform. In effect, to get the most out of it, the analyst really needs to know already where the failure is located. This makes low-power radiography a useful supplement to SQUID, but not a generally effective replacement for it. It would likely best be used immediately after SQUID to characterize morphology and depth of the shorting material once SQUID had pinpointed its location.

=== Short in a 3D Package ===
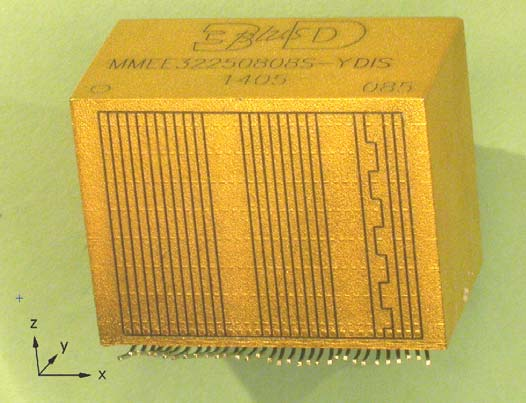
Figure 1: An external view of the EEPROM module shows the coordinate axis used while performing orthogonal magnetic current imaging. These axes are used to define the scanning planes in the body of the paper.

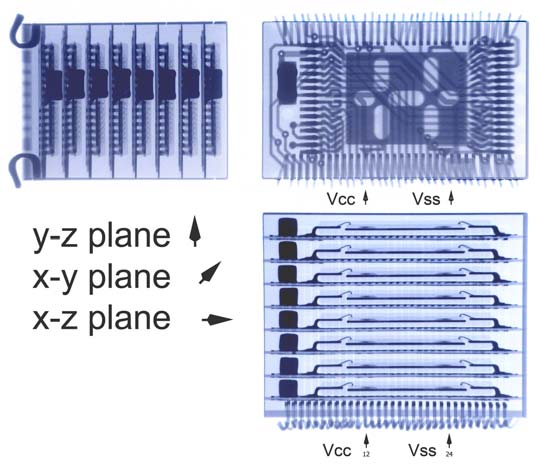
Figure 2: Radiography, showing three orthogonal views of the part, reveals internal construction of the module.

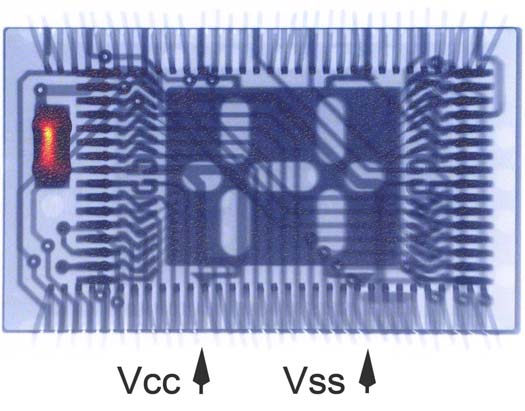
Figure 3: A magnetic current image overlay on an X-ray image of the EEPROM module. Thresholding was used to show only the strongest current at the capacitor of the TSOP08 mini-board. Arrows indicate Vcc and Vss pins. This image is in the x-y plane.

Examination of the module shown in Figure 1 in the Failure Analysis Laboratory found no external evidence of the failure. Coordinate axes of the device were chosen as shown in Figure 1. Radiography was performed on the module in three orthogonal views: side, end, and top-down; as shown in Figure 2. For purposes of this paper the top-down X-ray view shows the x-y plane of the module. The side view shows the x-z plane, and the end view shows the y-z plane. No anomalies were noted in the radiographic images. Excellent alignment of components on the mini-boards permitted an uncluttered top-down view of the mini-circuit boards. The internal construction of the module was seen to consist of eight, stacked mini-boards, each with a single microcircuit and capacitor. The mini-boards connected with the external module pins using the gold-plated exterior of the package. External inspection showed that laser-cut trenches created an external circuit on the device, which is used to enable, read, or write to any of the eight EEPROM devices in the encapsulated vertical stack. Regarding nomenclature, the laser-trenched gold panels on the exterior walls of the package were labeled with the pin numbers. The eight miniboards were labeled TSOP01 through TSOP08, beginning at the bottom of the package near the device pins.

Pin-to-pin electrical testing confirmed that Vcc Pins 12, 13, 14, and 15 were electrically common, presumably through the common exterior gold panel on the package wall. Likewise, Vss Pins 24, 25, 26, and 27 were common. Comparison to the xray images showed that these four pins funneled into a single wide trace on the mini-boards. All of the Vss pins were shorted to the Vcc pins with a resistance determined by the I-V slope at approximately 1.74 ohms, the low resistance indicating something other than an ESD defect. Similarly electrical overstress was considered an unlikely cause of failure as the part had not been under power since the time it was qualified at the factory. The three-dimensional geometry of the EEPROM module suggested the use of magnetic current imaging (MCI) on three, or more flat sides in order to construct the current path of the short within the module. As noted, the coordinate axes selected for this analysis are shown in Figure 1.

=== Magnetic Current Imaging ===
SQUIDs are the most sensitive magnetic sensors known. This allows one to scan currents of 500 nA at a working distance of about 400 micrometres. As for all near field situations, the resolution is limited by the scanning distance or, ultimately, by the sensor size (typical SQUIDs are about 30 μm wide), although software and data acquisition improvements allow locating currents within 3 micrometres. To operate, the SQUID sensor must be kept cool (about 77 K) and in vacuum, while the sample, at room temperature, is raster-scanned under the sensor at some working distance z, separated from the SQUID enclosure by a thin, transparent diamond window. This allows one to reduce the scanning distance to tens of micrometres from the sensor itself, improving the resolution of the tool.

The typical MCI sensor configuration is sensitive to magnetic fields in the perpendicular z direction (i.e., sensitive to the in-plane xy current distribution in the DUT). This does not mean that we are missing vertical information; in the simplest situation, if a current path jumps from one plane to another, getting closer to the sensor in the process, this will be revealed as stronger magnetic field intensity for the section closer to the sensor and also as higher intensity in the current density map. This way, vertical information can be extracted from the current density images. Further details about MCI can be found elsewhere.

== See also ==
- Josephson Effect
- BCS theory
- Low-Temperature Physics
- SQUID
- Failure analysis
- Semiconductor
