= Evoked activity =

Form of brain activity

Evoked activity is brain activity that is the result of a task, sensory input or motor output. It is opposed to spontaneous brain activity during the absence of any explicit task. Research suggests that neurological dysfunctions associated with evoked activity involve schizophrenia, epilepsy, and Alzheimer's disease.

Most experimental studies in neuroscience investigate brain functioning by administering a task or stimulus and measure the resulting changes in neuronal activity and behavior. In electroencephalography (EEG) research, evoked activity or evoked responses specifically refers to activity that is phase-locked to the stimulus onset and is opposed to induced activity, which is a stimulus-related change in (the amplitude of) oscillatory activity.

== See also ==
- Event-related potential
- Spontaneous activity
- Evoked potential
- Ongoing brain activity
- Evoked field
