= SERF =

Type of magnetometer

A spin exchange relaxation-free (SERF) magnetometer is a type of magnetometer developed at Princeton University in the early 2000s. SERF magnetometers measure magnetic fields by using lasers to detect the interaction between alkali metal atoms in a vapor and the magnetic field.

The name for the technique comes from the fact that spin exchange relaxation, a mechanism which usually scrambles the orientation of atomic spins, is avoided in these magnetometers. This is done by using a high (10^{14} cm^{−3}) density of potassium atoms and a very low magnetic field. Under these conditions, the atoms exchange spin quickly compared to their magnetic precession frequency so that the average spin interacts with the field and is not destroyed by decoherence.

A SERF magnetometer achieves very high magnetic field sensitivity by monitoring a high density vapor of alkali metal atoms precessing in a near-zero magnetic field. The sensitivity of SERF magnetometers improves upon traditional atomic magnetometers by eliminating the dominant cause of atomic spin decoherence caused by spin-exchange collisions among the alkali metal atoms. SERF magnetometers are among the most sensitive magnetic field sensors and in some cases exceed the performance of SQUID detectors of equivalent size. A small 1 cm^{3} volume glass cell containing potassium vapor has reported 1 fT/√Hz sensitivity and can theoretically become even more sensitive with larger volumes. They are vector magnetometers capable of measuring all three components of the magnetic field simultaneously.

== Spin-exchange relaxation ==
Spin-exchange collisions preserve total angular momentum of a colliding pair of atoms but can scramble the hyperfine state of the atoms. Atoms in different hyperfine states do not precess coherently and thereby limit the coherence lifetime of the atoms. However, decoherence due to spin-exchange collisions can be nearly eliminated if the spin-exchange collisions occur much faster than the precession frequency of the atoms. In this regime of fast spin-exchange, all atoms in an ensemble rapidly change hyperfine states, spending the same amounts of time in each hyperfine state and causing the spin ensemble to precess more slowly but remain coherent. This so-called SERF regime can be reached by operating with sufficiently high alkali metal density (at higher temperature) and in sufficiently low magnetic field.

Alkali metal atoms with hyperfine state indicated by color precessing in the presence of a magnetic field experience a spin-exchange collision which preserves total angular momentum but changes the hyperfine state, causing the atoms to precess in opposite directions and decohere.

Alkali metal atoms in the spin-exchange relaxation-free (SERF) regime with hyperfine state indicated by color precessing in the presence of a magnetic field experience two spin-exchange collisions in rapid succession which preserves total angular momentum but changes the hyperfine state, causing the atoms to precess in opposite directions only slightly before a second spin-exchange collision returns the atoms to the original hyperfine state.

The spin-exchange relaxation rate $R_{se}$ for atoms with low polarization experiencing slow spin-exchange can be expressed as follows:

$$R_{se} = \frac{1}{2 \pi T_{se}} \left( \frac{2 I(2 I -1)}{3(2I+1)^2} \right)$$

where $T_{se}$ is the time between spin-exchange collisions, $I$ is the nuclear spin, $\nu$ is the magnetic resonance frequency, $\gamma_e$ is the gyromagnetic ratio for an electron.

In the limit of fast spin-exchange and small magnetic field, the spin-exchange relaxation rate vanishes for sufficiently small magnetic field:

$$R_{se} = \frac{\gamma_e^2 B^2 T_{se} }{2 \pi} \frac{1}{2}\left( 1-\frac{(2I+1)^2}{Q^2} \right)$$

where $Q$ is the "slowing-down" constant to account for sharing of angular momentum between the electron and nuclear spins:

$$Q(I=3/2)=4\left( 2 - \frac{4}{3+P^2} \right)^{-1}$$
$$Q(I=5/2)=6\left( 3 - \frac{48(1+P^2)}{19+26 P^2+3 P^4} \right)^{-1}$$
$$Q(I=7/2)=8\left( \frac{4(1+7P^2+7P^4+P^6)}{11+35P^2+17P^4+P^6} \right)^{-1}$$

where $P$ is the average polarization of the atoms. The atoms suffering fast spin-exchange precess more slowly when they are not fully polarized because they spend a fraction of the time in different hyperfine states precessing at different frequencies (or in the opposite direction).

Relaxation rate $R_{tot} = Q \Delta \nu$ as indicated by magnetic resonance linewidth for atoms as a function of magnetic field. These lines represent operation with potassium vapor at 160, 180 and 200 °C (higher temperature provides higher relaxation rates) using a 2 cm diameter cell with 3 atm He buffer gas, 60 Torr N_{2} quenching gas. The SERF regime is clearly apparent for sufficiently low magnetic fields where the spin-exchange collisions occur much faster than the spin precession.

== Sensitivity ==
The sensitivity $\delta B$ of atomic magnetometers are limited by the number of atoms $N$ and their spin coherence lifetime $T_2$ according to

$$\delta B = \frac{1}{\gamma} \sqrt{\frac{2 R_{tot} Q}{F_z N} }$$

where $\gamma$ is the gyromagnetic ratio of the atom and $F_z$ is the average polarization of total atomic spin $F = I+S$.

In the absence of spin-exchange relaxation, a variety of other relaxation mechanisms contribute to the decoherence of atomic spin:

$$R_{tot} = R_D + R_{sd,self} + R_{sd,\mathrm{He}} + R_{sd,\mathrm{N_2}}$$

where $R_D$ is the relaxation rate due to collisions with the cell walls and $R_{sd,X}$ are the spin destruction rates for collisions among the alkali metal atoms and collisions between alkali atoms and any other gasses that may be present.

In an optimal configuration, a density of 10^{14} cm^{−3} potassium atoms in a 1 cm^{3} vapor cell with ~3 atm helium buffer gas can achieve 10 aT Hz^{−1/2} (10^{−17} T Hz^{−1/2}) sensitivity with relaxation rate $R_{tot}$ ≈ 1 Hz.

== Typical operation ==
Atomic magnetometer principle of operation, depicting alkali atoms polarized by a circularly polarized pump beam, precessing in the presence of a magnetic field and being detected by optical rotation of a linearly polarized probe beam.

Alkali metal vapor of sufficient density is obtained by simply heating solid alkali metal inside the vapor cell. A typical SERF atomic magnetometer can take advantage of low noise diode lasers to polarize and monitor spin precession. Circularly polarized pumping light tuned to the $D_1$ spectral resonance line polarizes the atoms. An orthogonal probe beam detects the precession using optical rotation of linearly polarized light. In a typical SERF magnetometer, the spins merely tip by a very small angle because the precession frequency is slow compared to the relaxation rates.

== Advantages and disadvantages ==
SERF magnetometers compete with SQUID magnetometers for use in a variety of applications. The SERF magnetometer has the following advantages:

- Equal or better sensitivity per unit volume
- Cryogen-free operation
- All-optical measurement limits enables imaging and eliminates interference

Potential disadvantages:

- Can only operate near zero field
- Sensor vapor cell must be heated

== Applications ==
Applications utilizing high sensitivity of SERF magnetometers potentially include:

- High-performance magnetoencephalographic imaging
- Sample magnetization measurement, especially rock samples

== History ==
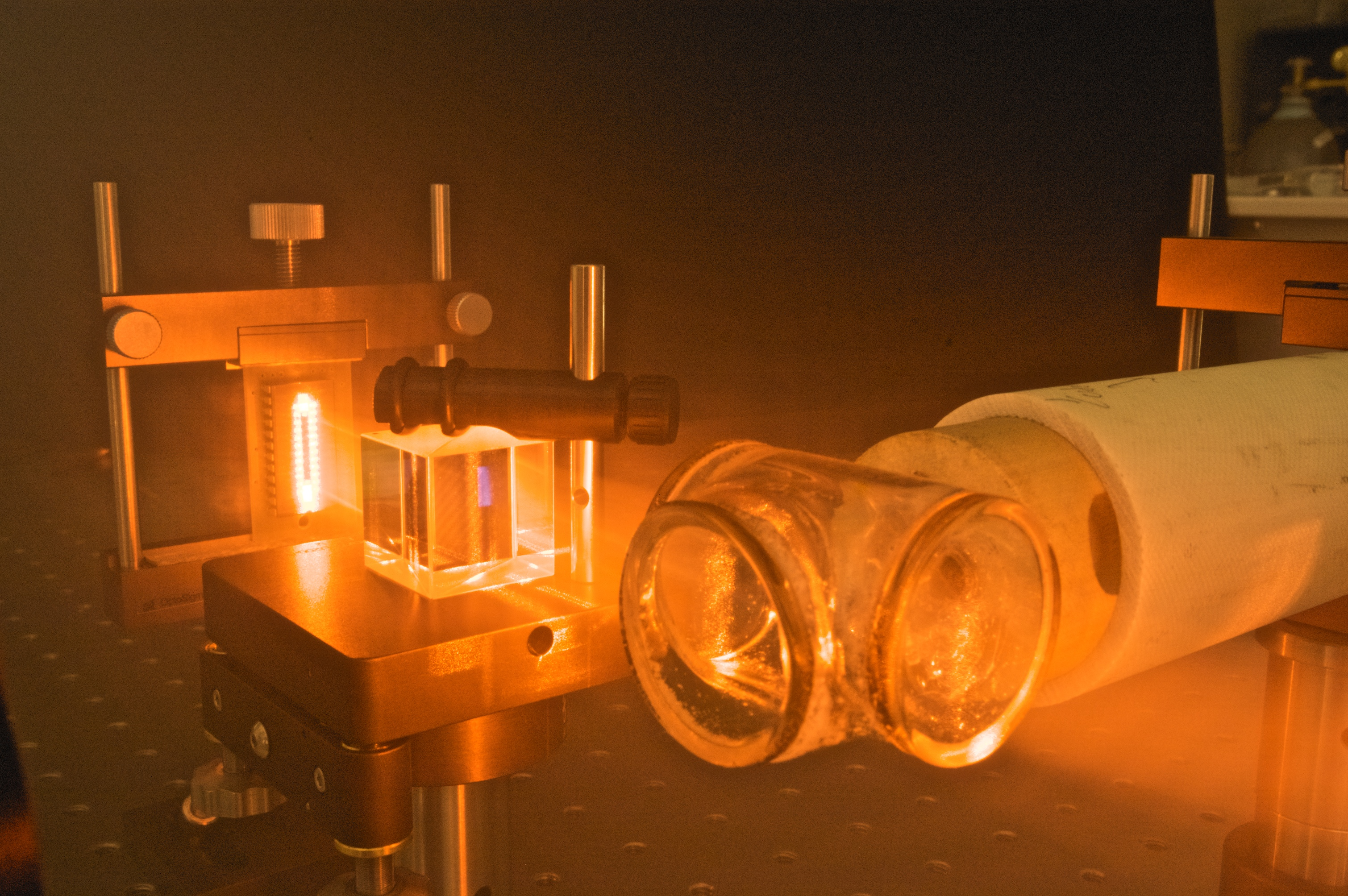
SERF components mockup

The SERF magnetometer was developed by Michael V. Romalis at Princeton University in the early 2000s. The underlying physics governing the suppression spin-exchange relaxation was developed decades earlier by William Happer but the application to magnetic field measurement was not explored at that time. The name "SERF" was partially motivated by its relationship to SQUID detectors in a marine metaphor.
