= Samuel Williamson (scientist) =

American physicist and neuroscientist

Samuel J. Williamson (November 6,1939, in West Reading, Pennsylvania – April 25, 2005) was an American physicist and neuroscientist.

Williamson was a co-developer of magnetic source imaging (MSI), and used this technique throughout his life to visualize and study brain activity especially as it relates to vision and hearing. He published over 100 articles in the fields of biomagnetism and neuroscience. He received both his bachelor's degree in physics and his Ph.D. from the Massachusetts Institute of Technology (MIT), in 1961 and 1965 respectively. Dr. Williamson started his professional career at MIT's Francis Bitter National Magnet Laboratory as a staff scientist, and remained there until 1971 when he joined the physics department at New York University (NYU). He was subsequently promoted to full professor of physics in 1977, became additionally a professor of neural science in 1987, and a University Professor in 1989, and was an associate of the Center for Neural Science. He remained at NYU until his retirement in 2000.

In 1981 he was elected a Fellow of the American Physical Society.
