= Evoked field =

Magnetic fields produced by brain activity

Evoked fields are part of the magnetoencephalogram. They are brain signals evoked by sensory stimulation, but usually buried by the ongoing brain activity. Repeating the stimulus multiple times and averaging the signals reduces the uncorrelated ongoing activity and reveals the evoked field. Evoked fields are the magnetoencephalographic equivalent to evoked potentials, which are part of the electroencephalogram.

== Auditory evoked fields ==
An auditory evoked field (AEF) is a form of neural activity that is induced by an auditory stimulus and recorded via magnetoencephalography, and is an equivalent of the auditory evoked potential (AEP) recorded by electroencephalography. The advantage of AEF over AEP is the powerful spatial resolution provided by magnetic field recording, which AEP lacks. Thus, research using AEF often deals with the global responses of the whole brain at the cortical level while focusing on the role of the auditory pathway. The common applications of AEF are prenatal and neonatal hearing screening, cortical pitch perception, language comprehension, and attention.

=== Sources and types of responses ===
The main source of the auditory evoked field is the auditory cortex and the association cortices. The earliest cortical component of the AEF is equivalent to the middle latency response (MLR) of the EEG evoked potential, called the middle latency auditory evoked field (MLAEF), which occurs at 30 to 50 ms after the stimulus onset. M30 and M50, occurring at 30 and 50 ms after the stimulus onset, correspond to the Pa and Pb peaks of MLR. The M50 response was often used to study the correlation of aging and hearing loss. Research has shown that the amplitude of contralateral M50 enlarges with age.

At 100 ms after stimulus onset occurs the most prominent response in the late latency range, the M100, which corresponds to the N1 peak of the auditory long latency response (ALR) potential. M100 is the most widely used magnetic field response clinically. In 2007, Lütkenhöner et al. demonstrated that M100 can be applied to estimate hearing threshold to a higher degree of accuracy.

Longer latency responses after 100 ms are referred as event-related field (ERF) that includes M150, M200, M300 (equivalent of P300), and M400.

== See also ==
- Evoked activity
- Magnetoencephalography
- Auditory evoked potential
- Induced activity
- Ongoing activity
