= Spin-destruction collision =

In atomic physics, a spin-destruction (or spin-disorientation) collision is a physical impact where the spin angular momentum of an atom is irretrievably scrambled.

This type of collision can be a significant spin relaxation mechanism for polarized alkali metal vapor. In particular, the relaxation rate of alkali metal atoms in SERF atomic magnetometers is dominated by spin-destruction collisions.

Spin-destruction cross sections
	σ_{sd,self}	σ_{sd,He}	σ_{sd,Ne}	σ_{sd,N2}
K	1 × 10^{−18} cm^{2}	8 × 10^{−25} cm^{2}		
Rb	9 × 10^{−18} cm^{2}	9 × 10^{−24} cm^{2}	5.2 × 10^{−23} cm^{2}	1 × 10^{−22} cm^{2}
Cs	2 × 10^{−16} cm^{2}	3 × 10^{−23} cm^{2}		6 × 10^{−22} cm^{2}
