= Magnetic marker monitoring =

Magnetic marker monitoring is a method to monitor the passage of an orally applied drug (tablet, capsule, etc.) through the intestinal tract. The dosage form is enriched with a small amount (0.1 – 2 mg) of magnetite (Fe_{3}O_{4}), which then is magnetized by a high-energy magnetic field. After application the path of the dosage form can be monitored with special detectors, which contain superconducting quantum interference devices (SQUIDs). Due to the very low magnetic field of the iron oxide a specially shielded room is necessary in order to eliminate environmental magnetic interference. The method should be able to yield information about why tablets dissolve unequally before or after meals, which may be important for the bioavailability of drugs.

A more developed method, Advanced Magnetic Marker Monitoring, uses the magnetic capsule, a segmented capsule held together by magnetic forces. The magnetic capsule delivers drugs to any targeted location in the gastrointestinal tract.

The way the capsule takes is monitored on a PC screen. As soon as the capsule has reached its destination, the magnetic field is destroyed by pressing a button and the drug is released for resorption within milliseconds.

The method is used during development or optimization of drug products and contributes significantly to the reduction in development time and costs.

Areas of use include the determination of resorption windows, early proof of concept studies, interaction studies, and optimization of pharmaceutical formulations.
