= Quatrefoil reentry =

Type of cardiac arrhythmia

Quatrefoil reentry is a type of cardiac arrhythmia that consists of two adjacent figure-of-eight reentrant circuits.

Quatrefoil reentry was predicted by bidomain simulations in 1991 and observed experimentally in 1999. Quatrefoil reentry can be induced by stimulating the heart through a single electrode twice, with the second stimulus timed near the end of the refractory period of the first action potential. If the second stimulus is a cathode, the wave fronts propagate initially parallel to the myocardial fibers; if it is an anode, the wave fronts propagate initially perpendicular to the fibers. Quatrefoil reentry can be understood qualitatively using a simple cellular automaton.
