= Spin-exchange =

In quantum mechanics, spin-exchange is an interaction process between two particles mediated by an exchange interaction. It preserves total angular momentum of the system but may allow other aspects of the system to change. When two spin-polarized atoms in their ground state experience a spin-exchange collision, the total spin of the atoms is preserved yet the orientation of the individual spins may change. For example, if atoms $A$ and $B$ are oppositely polarized, a spin-exchange collision reverses the spins:

$$A(\uparrow) + B(\downarrow) \rightarrow A(\downarrow) + B(\uparrow)$$

== In alkali metals ==
In a typical vapor of alkali metal atoms, spin-exchange collisions are the dominant type of interaction between atoms. The collisions happen so rapidly that they only alter the state of the electron spins and do not significantly affect the nuclear spins. Thus, spin-exchange collisions between alkali metal atoms can change the hyperfine state of the atoms while preserving total angular momentum of the colliding pair. As a result, spin-exchange collisions cause decoherence in ensembles of polarized atoms precessing in the presence of a magnetic field.

The time between spin-exchange collisions for a vapor of alkali metal atoms is

$$T_{se} = (\sigma_{se} n \bar{v}_{rel})^{-1}$$

where the spin exchange cross section for alkali metals such as K, Rb, and Cs is

$$\sigma_{se} = 2 \times 10^{-14} \ \mathrm{cm}^{2}$$

and where $n$ is the vapor density and $\bar{v}_{rel}$ is the average relative velocity given by the Maxwell–Boltzmann distribution:

$$\bar{v}_{rel} = \sqrt{\frac{16 R T}{\pi m} }$$

where $R$ is the ideal gas constant, $T$ is the temperature, and $m$ is the molar mass of the atoms.
