= James Edward Zimmerman =

James Edward Zimmerman (February 19, 1923 – August 4, 1999) was a coinventor of the radio-frequency superconducting quantum interference device (SQUID).

== Early life and education ==
Zimmerman was born in Lantry, South Dakota and grew up on a ranch. He received a B.S. in electrical engineering from the South Dakota School of Mines and Technology in 1943. Afterward, he joined the Westinghouse Research Laboratory in Pittsburgh, Pennsylvania. He received a Ph.D. in physics from the Carnegie Institute of Technology in 1953.

== Career ==
From 1953 to 1955, Zimmerman worked for the Smithsonian Institution and moved to California to work at the Table Mountain Observatory.

In 1955, Zimmerman began working at the Ford Motor Company in Dearborn, Michigan. He co-invented the SQUID while working at Ford in 1965, and the term "SQUID" was coined in 1966. Zimmerman left Dearborn in 1967 due to disagreements with SQUID collaborator James Mercereau. He joined Aeronutronic, a defense division of Philco-Ford.

In 1970, Zimmerman joined the National Bureau of Standards, where he worked until 1985. While at NIST, Zimmerman introduced two important innovations in SQUID magnetometry:

- Fractional-turn SQUID, improving the coupling efficiency
- SQUID gradiometer, improving sensitivity to nearby fields

In addition, in the late 1970s and early 1980s, he also contributed to the development of low-power closed-cycle Stirling refrigerators, to reach temperatures in the range 4K - 8K with the purpose of cooling SQUID devices and small-scale superconducting electronics without resorting to liquid helium dewar vessels.

A major achievement was the use of plastic parts made in the laboratory, which would be assembled in a totally non-magnetic cryocooler (refrigerator), in order not to interfere with highly sensitive SQUIDs. Later, he was also involved in the development of pulse tube cryocoolers.

== Personal life ==
Zimmerman married Australian citizen Jean McLeod, whom he met while in Sydney for a Westinghouse Research Laboratory assignment. They had one daughter, Janet, born in 1947.

Zimmerman died of cancer on August 4, 1999.

== Awards ==
- NIST Fellow
- Samuel Wesley Stratton Award, the highest award for scientific achievement conferred by NIST
