= Magnetogastrography =

Recordings of magnetic fields in the stomach

Magnetogastrography is the science of recording magnetogastrograms (MGGs). Magnetogastrograms are recordings of magnetic fields resulting from electrical currents in the stomach. The magnetic fields are typically recorded using SQUIDs.

== See also ==
- Electrogastrogram
- Magnetoencephalography
