= Josephson diode =

Superconducting quantum material diode

A Josephson diode (JD) is a special type of Josephson junction (JJ), which conducts (super)current in one direction better than in the opposite direction. In other words, it has asymmetric current-voltage characteristic. Since the Josephson diode is a superconducting device, the asymmetry of the supercurrent transport is the main focus of attention. Opposite to conventional Josephson junctions, the critical (maximum) supercurrents $I_{c+}$ and $I_{c-}$ for opposite bias directions are different by absolute values ($I_{c+}\neq|I_{c-}|$). In the presence of such a non-reciprocity, the bias currents of any magnitude in the range between $I_{c+}$ and $|I_{c-}|$ can flow without resistance in only one direction.

This asymmetry, characterized by the ratio of critical currents $\mathcal{A}$, is the main figure of merit of Josephson diodes and is the subject of new developments and optimizations. The Josephson diode effect can occur, e.g., in superconducting devices where time reversal symmetry and inversion symmetry are broken.

Josephson diodes can be subdivided into two categories, those requiring an external (magnetic) field to be asymmetric and those not requiring an external magnetic field --- the so-called "field-free" Josephson diodes (more attractive for applications). In 2021, the Josephson diode was realized in the absence of applied magnetic field in a non-centrosymmetric material, followed shortly by the first realization of the zero-field Josephson diode in an inversion-symmetric device.

== History ==
Since decades the physicists tried to construct Josephson junction devices with asymmetric critical currents. This didn't involve new physical principles or advanced (quantum) material engineering, but rather electrical engineering tricks like combining several JJs in a special way (e.g. asymmetric 3JJ SQUID) or specially designed long JJs or JJ arrays, where Josephson vortex transport was asymmetric in opposite directions. After all, if one does not look inside the device, but treats such a device as a black box with two electrodes, its current-voltage characteristic is asymmetric with $I_{c+}\neq|I_{c-}|$. Such devices were especially popular in the context of Josephson ratchets — devices used to rectify random or deterministic signals with zero time-average. These devices can be subdivided into several classes:

- asymmetric SQUID-like devices: (Note: The modern jargon keyword is SNAIL, which denotes a SQUID with $N$ JJs in one branch and one JJ in the other branch. As a whole SNAIL has reflection asymmetric supercurrent-phase relation and, therefore, different critical currents $I_{c+}\neq|I_{c+}|$.) proposals and experimental implementations
- long JJs with asymmetric vortex depinning currents: experimental implementations
- Josephson fluxonic diodes
- JJ arrays: proposals and experiments.
- intermediate length JJ with specially modulated properties/geometry: e.g. tunable $\varphi$-JJs and in-line JJs made of Nb and YBCO showing record critical current asymmetry ratios of $\mathcal{A}\sim10$.

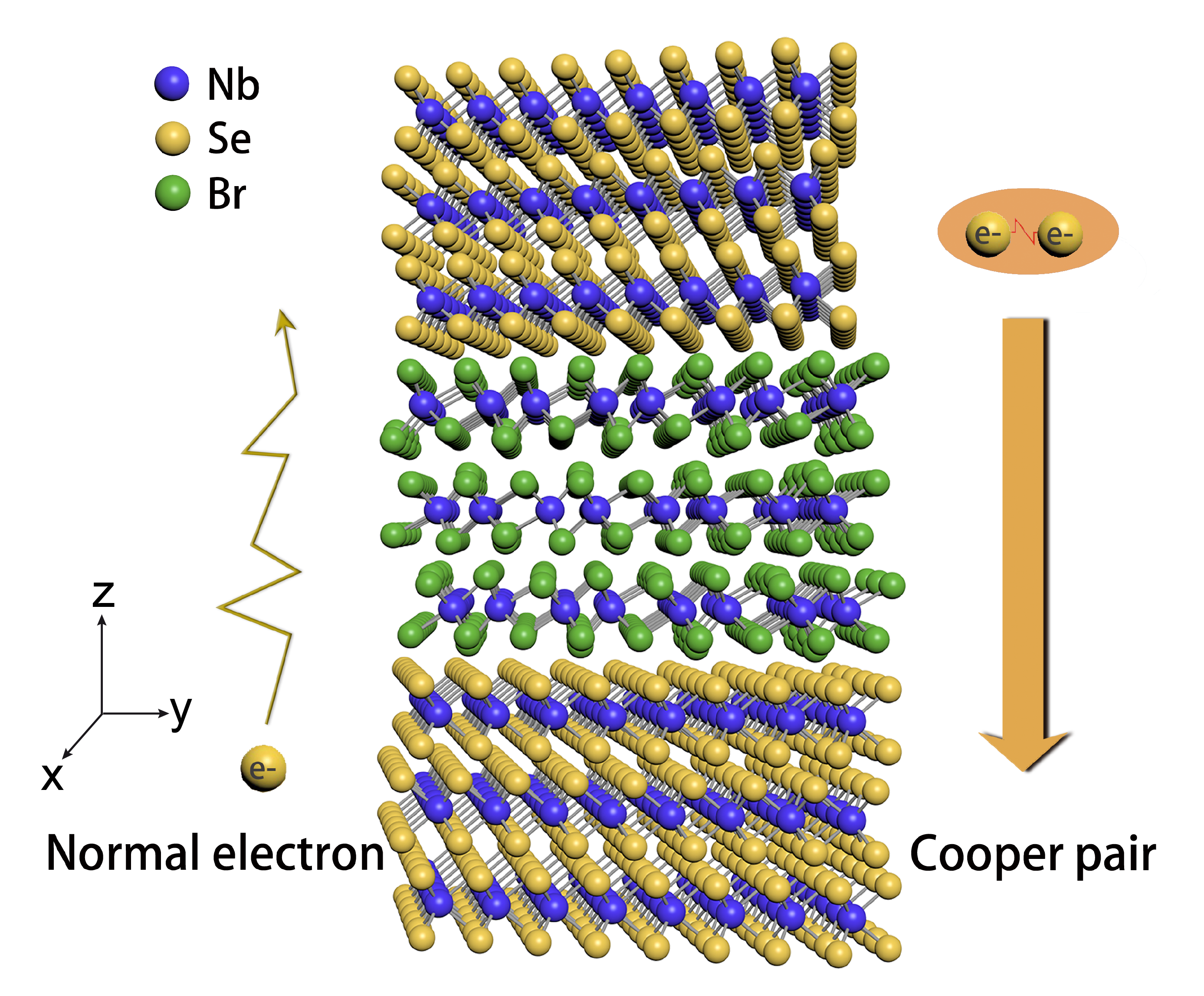
Atomic structure of the field free Josephson diode using NbSe_{2} and Nb_{3}Br_{8}.

Starting from 2020 one observes a new wave of interest to the systems with non-reciprocal supercurrent transport based on novel materials and physical principles.

- In 2020, a superconducting diode effect (see below) was demonstrated in an artificial $N\times$[Nb|V|Ta|] superlattice. (not yet a Josephson system). It was based on the previous proposal with design similar to conventional semiconducting p-n junctions, but utilizing hole and electron doped superconductors. Next year the Josephson diode was demonstrated in van der Waals heterostructure of NbSe_{2}/Nb_{3}Br_{8}/NbSe_{2}. In this heterostructure the weak link (Josephson barrier) Nb_{3}Br_{8} is a quantum material that is predicted to be an obstructed atomic insulator / Mott insulator and is non-centrosymmetric, i.e., it distinguishes between electrons with positive and negative momentum. However, the asymmetry of such device was very low ($\mathcal{A}\approx1.07$).
- A Josephson diode at zero applied field was observed in small twist-angle trilayer graphene, a system which possesses in-plane inversion symmetry. In this case, the superconducting state itself is responsible for the breaking of time reversal symmetry and in-plane inversion symmetry.
- In 2022, a Josephson diode in symmetric Al|InAs(2DEG)|Al junction (array) was demonstrated, exhibiting asymmetry $\mathcal{A}\approx2$ relevant for applications.
- Josephson diode based on Nb|Pt+YIG|Nb heterostructure operates at zero magnetic field and with the possibility to reverse its direction demonstrates similar asymmetry ratio at $T\approx2\,\mathrm{K}$.
- Josephson diode using the topological semi-metal NiTe_{2} as a barrier, demonstrates $\mathcal{A}\approx2.3$ at $T\approx3.8\,\mathrm{K}$.

In-depth review of recent developments.

== Superconducting diode effect ==
The superconducting diode effect is an example of nonreciprocal superconductivity, where a material is superconducting in one direction and resistive in the other. This leads to half-wave rectification when a square wave AC-current is applied. In 2020, this effect was demonstrated in an artificial [Nb/V/Ta]_{n} superlattice. The phenomenon in the Josephson diode is believed to originate from asymmetric Josephson tunneling. Unlike conventional semiconducting junction diodes, the superconducting diode effect can be realized in Josephson junctions as well as junction-free bulk superconductors.

== Theories ==
Currently, the precise mechanism behind the Josephson diode effect is not fully understood. However, some theories have emerged that are now under theoretical investigation. There are two types of Josephson diodes, relating to which symmetries are being broken. The inversion breaking Josephson diode, and the Josephson diode breaking inversion breaking and time-reversal. The minimal symmetry breaking requirement for forming the Josephson diode is inversion symmetry breaking, and is required to obtain nonreciprocal transport. One proposed mechanism originates from finite momentum Cooper pairs. It may also be possible that the superconducting diode effect in the JD originates from self-field effects, but this still has to be rigorously studied.

== Figures of merit ==
Depending on the potential application different parameters of the Josephson diodes, from operation temperature to their size can be important. However, the most important parameter is the asymmetry of critical currents (also called non-reciprocity). It can be defined as dimensionless ratio of larger to smaller critical currents

$\mathcal{A}=\frac{\mathrm{max}(I_{c+},|I_{c-}|)}{\mathrm{min}(I_{c+},|I_{c-}|)}$

to be always positive and lay in the range from 1 (symmetric JJ) to $\infty$ (infinitely asymmetric one). Instead, some researchers use the so-called efficiency, defined as

$\eta=\left|\frac{I_{c+}-|I_{c-}|}{I_{c+}+|I_{c-}|}\right| = \frac{\mathcal{A}-1}{\mathcal{A}+1}.$

It lays in the range from 0 (symmetric system) to 1 (infinitely asymmetric system). (Note: Note that some authors divide the difference of critical currents to the average critical current$(I_{c+}+I_{c-})/2$. Then efficiency has the range 0..2, and if they quote 80%, $\eta$ is actually only 40%.) Among other things the efficiency $\eta$ shows the theoretical limit for thermodynamic efficiency (ratio of output to input power) that can be reached by the diode during rectification.

Intuitively it is clear that the larger the asymmetry $\mathcal{A}$ is, the better the diode performs. A quantitative analysis showed that a large asymmetry allows one to achieve rectification in a wide range of driving current amplitudes, a large counter current (corresponding to a heavy load), against which rectification is still possible, and a large thermodynamic efficiency (ratio of output dc to input ac power).

Thus, to create a practically relevant diode one should design a system with high asymmetry. The asymmetry ratios (efficiency) for different implementations of Josephson diodes are summarized in the table below.

Size. Previously demonstrated Josephson diodes were rather large (see the table), which hampers their integration into micro- or nano-electronic superconducting circuits or stacking. Novel devices based on heterostructures can potentially have 100 nm-scale dimensions, which is difficult to achieve using previous approaches with long JJs, fluxons, etc.

Voltage. Important parameter of any nano-rectifier is the maximum dc voltage produced. See the table for comparison.

Operating temperature. Ideally one would like to operate the diode in wide temperature range. Obviously, an upper limit in operation temperature is given by the transition temperature $T_c$ of the superconducting material(s) used to fabricate the Josephson diodes. In the table below we quote the operating temperature for which the other parameters such as asymmetry are quoted. Many novel diodes, unfortunately, operate below 4.2K.

Figures of merit of different Josephson diodes
| Reference | type | $\mathcal{A}$ | $\eta$ | $V_\mathrm{max}(\mathrm{\mu V})$ (Note: Maximum rectified voltage achieved) | area($\mathrm{\mu m^2}$) (Note: Minimal rectangular area of the device essential for its operation, without electrodes, etc.) | $T_\mathrm{op}$(K) (Note: Operating temperature for which figures of merit are given) |
|---|---|---|---|---|---|---|
| Carapella (2001) | ALJJ (Note: Annular Long Josephson junction) | 1.2 | 9% | 20 | 44500 | 6.5 |
| Beck (2005) | ALJJ Nb-AlO-Nb | 2.2 | 38% | 20 | 5700 | 6 |
| Wang (2009) | ASILJJ (Note: Annular Stack of Intrinsic Long Josephson Junctions) BSCCO | 2.8 | 47% | 100 | 800 | 4.2 |
| Knufinke (2012) | ALJJ Nb-AlO-Nb | 1.6 | 23% | 40 | 4900 | 4.2 |
| Sterck (2005, 2009) | 3JJ-SQUID Nb-AlO-Nb | 2.5 | 43% | 25 | 1125 | 4.2 |
| Paolucci (2023) | 2JJ SQUID | 3 | 50% | 8 | 72 | 0.4 |
| Menditto (2016) | $\varphi$-JJ Nb-AlO-NbCu-Nb | 2.5 | 43% | 150 | 2000 | 1.7 |
| Golod (2022) | inline Nb JJ | 4(10) | 60%(82%) | 8 | 7.2 | 7 |
| Schmid (2024) | inline YBCO JJ | 7 | 75% | 212 | 1 | 4.2 |
| Wu (2022) | NbSe_{2}-Nb_{3}Br_{8}-NbSe_{2} | 1.07 | 3.4% | 1600 (Note: For rectangular drive. For sinusoidal drive the voltage is (substantially) lower.) | 3.7 | 0.02 |
| Jeon (2022) | Nb-Pt+YIG-Nb | 2.07 | 35% | - | ~4 | 2 |
| Pal (2022) | Nb-Ti-NiTe_{2}-Ti-Nb | 2.3 | 40% | 8 | ~3 | 3.8 |
| Baumgartner (2022) | Al-2DEG-Al | 2 | 30% | - | 7 | 0.1 |
| Ghosh (2024) | twisted BSCCO flakes | 4 | 60% | 25 | 100 | 80 |

== See also ==
- Josephson effect
- $\varphi$ Josephson junction
