= Sine-Gordon equation =

Nonlinear partial differential equation

The sine-Gordon equation is a second-order nonlinear partial differential equation for a function $\varphi$ dependent on two variables typically denoted $x$ and $t$, involving the wave operator and the sine of $\varphi$.

It was originally introduced by Edmond Bour (1862) in the course of study of surfaces of constant negative curvature as the Gauss–Codazzi equation for surfaces of constant Gaussian curvature −1 in 3-dimensional space. The equation was rediscovered by Yakov Frenkel and Tatyana Kontorova (1939) in their study of crystal dislocations known as the Frenkel–Kontorova model.

This equation attracted a lot of attention in the 1970s due to the presence of soliton solutions, and is an example of an integrable PDE. Among well-known integrable PDEs, the sine-Gordon equation is the only relativistic system due to its Lorentz invariance.

== Realizations of the sine-Gordon equation ==
=== Differential geometry ===
This is the first derivation of the equation, by Bour (1862).

There are two equivalent forms of the sine-Gordon equation. In the (real) space-time coordinates, denoted $(x,t)$, the equation reads:

$$\varphi_{tt} - \varphi_{xx} + \sin\varphi = 0,$$

where partial derivatives are denoted by subscripts. Passing to the light-cone coordinates (u, v), akin to asymptotic coordinates where

$$u = \frac{x + t}{2}, \quad v = \frac{x - t}{2},$$

the equation takes the form

$$\varphi_{uv} = \sin\varphi.$$

This is the original form of the sine-Gordon equation, as it was considered in the 19th century in the course of investigation of surfaces of constant Gaussian curvature K = −1, also called pseudospherical surfaces.

Consider an arbitrary pseudospherical surface. Across every point on the surface there are two asymptotic curves. This allows us to construct a distinguished coordinate system for such a surface, in which u = constant, v = constant are the asymptotic lines, and the coordinates are incremented by the arc length on the surface. At every point on the surface, let $\varphi$ be the angle between the asymptotic lines.

The first fundamental form of the surface is

$$ds^2 = du^2 + 2\cos\varphi \,du\,dv + dv^2,$$

and the second fundamental form is
$$L = N = 0, M = \sin \varphi$$
and the Gauss–Codazzi equation is
$$\varphi_{uv} = \sin\varphi.$$
Thus, any pseudospherical surface gives rise to a solution of the sine-Gordon equation, although with some caveats: if the surface is complete, it is necessarily singular due to the Hilbert embedding theorem. In the simplest case, the pseudosphere, also known as the tractroid, corresponds to a static one-soliton, but the tractroid has a singular cusp at its equator.

Conversely, one can start with a solution to the sine-Gordon equation to obtain a pseudosphere uniquely up to rigid transformations. There is a theorem, sometimes called the fundamental theorem of surfaces, that if a pair of matrix-valued bilinear forms satisfy the Gauss–Codazzi equations, then they are the first and second fundamental forms of an embedded surface in 3-dimensional space. Solutions to the sine-Gordon equation can be used to construct such matrices by using the forms obtained above.

Lie transform applied to pseudosphere to obtain a Dini surface

=== New solutions from old ===
The study of this equation and of the associated transformations of pseudospherical surfaces in the 19th century by Bianchi and Bäcklund led to the discovery of Bäcklund transformations. Another transformation of pseudospherical surfaces is the Lie transform introduced by Sophus Lie in 1879, which corresponds to Lorentz boosts for solutions of the sine-Gordon equation.

There are also some more straightforward ways to construct new solutions but which do not give new surfaces. Since the sine-Gordon equation is odd, the negative of any solution is another solution. However this does not give a new surface, as the sign-change comes down to a choice of direction for the normal to the surface. New solutions can be found by translating the solution: if $\varphi$ is a solution, then so is $\varphi + 2n\pi$ for $n$ an integer.

=== A mechanical model ===
A line of pendula, with a "breather pattern" oscillating in the middle. Unfortunately, the picture is drawn with gravity pointing up.

Consider a line of pendula, hanging on a straight line, in constant gravity. Connect the bobs of the pendula together by a string in constant tension. Let the angle of the pendulum at location $x$ be $\varphi$, then schematically, the dynamics of the line of pendulum follows Newton's second law:
$$\underbrace{m\varphi_{tt}}_{\text{mass times acceleration}} = \underbrace{T \varphi_{xx}}_{\text{tension}} - \underbrace{mg \sin\varphi }_{\text{gravity}}$$
and this is the sine-Gordon equation, after scaling time and distance appropriately.

Note that this is not exactly correct, since the net force on a pendulum due to the tension is not precisely $T\varphi_{xx}$, but more accurately $T\varphi_{xx} (1+\varphi_x^2)^{-3/2}$. However this does give an intuitive picture for the sine-gordon equation. One can produce exact mechanical realizations of the sine-gordon equation by more complex methods.

== Naming ==
The name "sine-Gordon equation" is a pun on the well-known Klein–Gordon equation in physics:

$$\varphi_{tt} - \varphi_{xx} + \varphi = 0.$$

The sine-Gordon equation is the Euler–Lagrange equation of the field whose Lagrangian density is given by

$$\mathcal{L}_\text{SG}(\varphi) = \frac{1}{2} (\varphi_t^2 - \varphi_x^2) - 1 + \cos\varphi.$$

Using the Taylor series expansion of the cosine in the Lagrangian,

$$\cos(\varphi) = \sum_{n=0}^\infty \frac{(-\varphi^2)^n}{(2n)!},$$

it can be rewritten as the Klein–Gordon Lagrangian plus higher-order terms:

$$\begin{align}
\mathcal{L}_\text{SG}(\varphi) &= \frac{1}{2} (\varphi_t^2 - \varphi_x^2) - \frac{\varphi^2}{2} + \sum_{n=2}^\infty \frac{(-\varphi^2)^n}{(2n)!} \\
&= \mathcal{L}_\text{KG}(\varphi) + \sum_{n=2}^\infty \frac{(-\varphi^2)^n}{(2n)!}.
\end{align}$$

== Soliton solutions ==
An interesting feature of the sine-Gordon equation is the existence of soliton and multisoliton solutions.

=== 1-soliton solutions ===
The sine-Gordon equation has the following 1-soliton solutions:

$$\varphi_\text{soliton}(x, t) := 4 \arctan \left(e^{m \gamma (x - vt) + \delta}\right),$$

where

$$\gamma^2 = \frac{1}{1 - v^2},$$

and the slightly more general form of the equation is assumed:

$$\varphi_{tt} - \varphi_{xx} + m^2 \sin\varphi = 0.$$

The 1-soliton solution for which we have chosen the positive root for $\gamma$ is called a kink and represents a twist in the variable $\varphi$ which takes the system from one constant solution $\varphi = 0$ to an adjacent constant solution $\varphi = 2\pi$. The states $\varphi \cong 2\pi n$ are known as vacuum states, as they are constant solutions of zero energy. The 1-soliton solution in which we take the negative root for $\gamma$ is called an antikink. The form of the 1-soliton solutions can be obtained through application of a Bäcklund transform to the trivial (vacuum) solution and the integration of the resulting first-order differentials:

$$\varphi'_u = \varphi_u + 2\beta \sin\frac{\varphi' + \varphi}{2},$$

$$\varphi'_v = -\varphi_v + \frac{2}{\beta} \sin\frac{\varphi' - \varphi}{2} \text{ with } \varphi = \varphi_0 = 0$$

for all time.

The 1-soliton solutions can be visualized with the use of the elastic ribbon sine-Gordon model introduced by Julio Rubinstein in 1970. Here we take a clockwise (left-handed) twist of the elastic ribbon to be a kink with topological charge $\theta_\text{K} = -1$. The alternative counterclockwise (right-handed) twist with topological charge $\theta_\text{AK} = +1$ will be an antikink.

Traveling kink soliton represents a propagating clockwise twist.

Traveling antikink soliton represents a propagating counterclockwise twist.

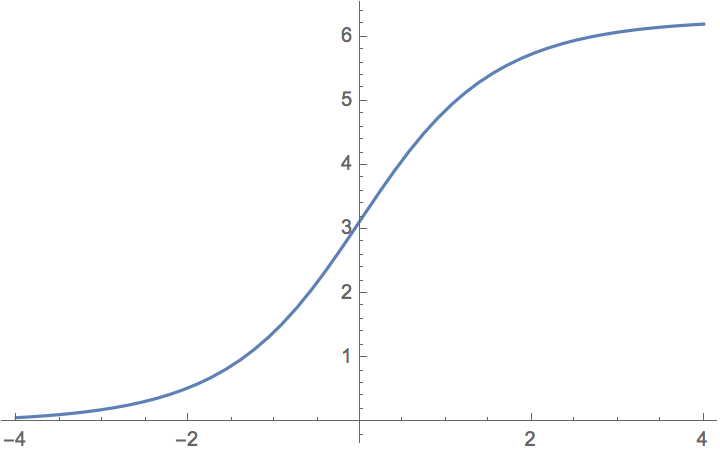
Static 1-soliton solution $4\arctan e^x$

=== 2-soliton solutions ===
Multi-soliton solutions can be obtained through continued application of the Bäcklund transform to the 1-soliton solution, as prescribed by a Bianchi lattice relating the transformed results. The 2-soliton solutions of the sine-Gordon equation show some of the characteristic features of the solitons. The traveling sine-Gordon kinks and/or antikinks pass through each other as if perfectly permeable, and the only observed effect is a phase shift. Since the colliding solitons recover their velocity and shape, such an interaction is called an elastic collision.

The kink-kink solution is given by
$$\varphi_{K/K}(x,t) = 4 \arctan \left(\frac{v \sinh \frac{x}{\sqrt{1 - v^2}}}{\cosh \frac{vt}{\sqrt{1 - v^2}}}\right)$$

while the kink-antikink solution is given by
$$\varphi_{K/AK}(x,t) = 4 \arctan \left(\frac{v \cosh \frac{x}{\sqrt{1 - v^2}}}{\sinh \frac{vt}{\sqrt{1 - v^2}}}\right)$$

Antikink-kink collision.

Kink-kink collision.

Another interesting 2-soliton solutions arise from the possibility of coupled kink-antikink behaviour known as a breather. There are known three types of breathers: standing breather, traveling large-amplitude breather, and traveling small-amplitude breather.

The standing breather solution is given by
$$\varphi(x,t) = 4 \arctan\left(\frac{\sqrt{1-\omega^2}\;\cos(\omega t)}{\omega\;\cosh(\sqrt{1-\omega^2}\; x)}\right).$$

The standing breather is an oscillating coupled kink-antikink soliton.

Large-amplitude moving breather.

Small-amplitude moving breather – looks exotic, but essentially has a breather envelope.

=== 3-soliton solutions ===
3-soliton collisions between a traveling kink and a standing breather or a traveling antikink and a standing breather results in a phase shift of the standing breather. In the process of collision between a moving kink and a standing breather, the shift of the breather $\Delta_\text{B}$ is given by

$$\Delta_\text{B} =\frac{2\operatorname{artanh}\sqrt{(1 - \omega^2)(1 - v_\text{K}^2)}}{\sqrt{1 - \omega^2}},$$

where $v_\text{K}$ is the velocity of the kink, and $\omega$ is the breather's frequency. If the old position of the standing breather is $x_0$, after the collision the new position will be $x_0 + \Delta_\text{B}$.

Collision of moving kink and standing breather.

Collision of moving antikink and standing breather.

== Bäcklund transformation ==
Suppose that $\varphi$ is a solution of the sine-Gordon equation
$$\varphi_{uv} = \sin \varphi.\,$$

Then the system
$$\begin{align}
\psi_u & = \varphi_u + 2a \sin \Bigl( \frac{\psi+\varphi}{2} \Bigr) \\
\psi_v & = -\varphi_v + \frac{2}{a} \sin \Bigl( \frac{\psi-\varphi}{2} \Bigr)
\end{align} \,\!$$
where a is an arbitrary parameter, is solvable for a function $\psi$ which will also satisfy the sine-Gordon equation. This is an example of an auto-Bäcklund transform, as both $\varphi$ and $\psi$ are solutions to the same equation, that is, the sine-Gordon equation.

By using a matrix system, it is also possible to find a linear Bäcklund transform for solutions of sine-Gordon equation.

For example, if $\varphi$ is the trivial solution $\varphi \equiv 0$, then $\psi$ is the one-soliton solution with $a$ related to the boost applied to the soliton.

== Topological charge and energy ==
The topological charge or winding number of a solution $\varphi$ is
$$N = \frac{1}{2\pi} \int_\mathbb{R} d\varphi = \frac{1}{2\pi} \left[\varphi(x = \infty, t) - \varphi(x = -\infty, t)\right].$$
The energy of a solution $\varphi$ is
$$E = \int_\mathbb{R}dx \left(\frac{1}{2}( \varphi_t^2 + \varphi_x^2) + m^2(1 - \cos\varphi)\right)$$
where a constant energy density has been added so that the potential is non-negative. With it the first two terms in the Taylor expansion of the potential coincide with the potential of a massive scalar field, as mentioned in the naming section; the higher order terms can be thought of as interactions.

The topological charge is conserved if the energy is finite. The topological charge does not determine the solution, even up to Lorentz boosts. Both the trivial solution and the soliton-antisoliton pair solution have $N = 0$.

== Zero-curvature formulation ==
The sine-Gordon equation is equivalent to the curvature of a particular $\mathfrak{su}(2)$-connection on $\mathbb{R}^2$ being equal to zero.

Explicitly, with coordinates $(u,v)$ on $\mathbb{R}^2$, the connection components $A_\mu$ are given by
$$A_u = \begin{pmatrix}i\lambda & \frac{i}{2}\varphi_u \\ \frac{i}{2}\varphi_u & -i\lambda\end{pmatrix} = \frac{1}{2}\varphi_u i\sigma_1 + \lambda i\sigma_3,$$
$$A_v = \begin{pmatrix}-\frac{i}{4\lambda}\cos\varphi & -\frac{1}{4\lambda}\sin\varphi \\ \frac{1}{4\lambda}\sin\varphi & \frac{i}{4\lambda}\cos\varphi\end{pmatrix} = -\frac{1}{4\lambda}i\sin\varphi\sigma_2 - \frac{1}{4\lambda}i\cos\varphi\sigma_3,$$
where the $\sigma_i$ are the Pauli matrices. Then the zero-curvature equation
$$\partial_v A_u - \partial_u A_v + [A_u, A_v] = 0$$

is equivalent to the sine-Gordon equation $\varphi_{uv} = \sin\varphi$. The zero-curvature equation is so named as it corresponds to the curvature being equal to zero if it is defined $F_{\mu\nu} = [\partial_\mu - A_\mu, \partial_\nu - A_\nu]$.

The pair of matrices $A_u$ and $A_v$ are also known as a Lax pair for the sine-Gordon equation, in the sense that the zero-curvature equation recovers the PDE rather than them satisfying Lax's equation.

== Related equations ==
The sinh-Gordon equation is given by

$$\varphi_{xx} - \varphi_{tt} = \sinh\varphi.$$

This is the Euler–Lagrange equation of the Lagrangian

$$\mathcal{L} = \frac{1}{2} (\varphi_t^2 - \varphi_x^2) - \cosh\varphi.$$

Another closely related equation is the elliptic sine-Gordon equation or Euclidean sine-Gordon equation, given by

$$\varphi_{xx} + \varphi_{yy} = \sin\varphi,$$

where $\varphi$ is now a function of the variables x and y. This is no longer a soliton equation, but it has many similar properties, as it is related to the sine-Gordon equation by the analytic continuation (or Wick rotation) y = it.

The elliptic sinh-Gordon equation may be defined in a similar way.

Another similar equation comes from the Euler–Lagrange equation for Liouville field theory

$$\varphi_{xx} - \varphi_{tt} = 2e^{2\varphi}.$$

A generalization is given by Toda field theory. More precisely, Liouville field theory is the Toda field theory for the finite Kac–Moody algebra $\mathfrak{sl}_2$, while sin(h)-Gordon is the Toda field theory for the affine Kac–Moody algebra $\hat \mathfrak{sl}_2$.

== Infinite volume and on a half line ==
One can also consider the sine-Gordon model on a circle, on a line segment, or on a half line. It is possible to find boundary conditions which preserve the integrability of the model. On a half line the spectrum contains boundary bound states in addition to the solitons and breathers.

== Quantum sine-Gordon model ==
In quantum field theory the sine-Gordon model contains a parameter that can be identified with the Planck constant. The particle spectrum consists of a soliton, an anti-soliton and a finite (possibly zero) number of breathers. The number of breathers depends on the value of the parameter. Multiparticle production cancels on mass shell.

Semi-classical quantization of the sine-Gordon model was done by Ludwig Faddeev and Vladimir Korepin. The exact quantum scattering matrix was discovered by Alexander Zamolodchikov. This model is S-dual to the Thirring model, as discovered by Coleman. This is sometimes known as the Coleman correspondence and serves as an example of boson-fermion correspondence in the interacting case. This article also showed that the constants appearing in the model behave nicely under renormalization: there are three parameters $\alpha_0, \beta$ and $\gamma_0$. Coleman showed $\alpha_0$ receives only a multiplicative correction, $\gamma_0$ receives only an additive correction, and $\beta$ is not renormalized. Further, for a critical, non-zero value $\beta = \sqrt{4\pi}$, the theory is in fact dual to a free massive Dirac field theory.

The quantum sine-Gordon equation should be modified so the exponentials become vertex operators

$$\mathcal{L}_{QsG} = \frac{1}{2} \partial_\mu \varphi \partial^\mu \varphi + \frac{1}{2}m_0^2\varphi^2 - \alpha(V_\beta + V_{-\beta})$$

with $V_\beta = :e^{i\beta\varphi}:$, where the semi-colons denote normal ordering. A possible mass term is included.

=== Regimes of renormalizability ===
For different values of the parameter $\beta^2$, the renormalizability properties of the sine-Gordon theory change. The identification of these regimes is attributed to Jürg Fröhlich.

The finite regime is $\beta^2 < 4\pi$, where no counterterms are needed to render the theory well-posed. The super-renormalizable regime is $4\pi \leq \beta^2 < 8\pi$, where a finite number of counterterms are needed to render the theory well-posed. More counterterms are needed for each threshold $\frac{n}{n+1}8\pi$ passed. For $\beta^2 > 8\pi$, the theory becomes ill-defined (Coleman 1975). The boundary values are $\beta^2 = 4\pi$ and $\beta^2 = 8\pi$, which are respectively the free fermion point, as the theory is dual to a free fermion via the Coleman correspondence, and the self-dual point, where the vertex operators form an affine sl_{2} subalgebra, and the theory becomes strictly renormalizable (renormalizable, but not super-renormalizable).

== Stochastic sine-Gordon model ==
The stochastic or dynamical sine-Gordon model has been studied by Martin Hairer and Hao Shen allowing heuristic results from the quantum sine-Gordon theory to be proven in a statistical setting.

The equation is
$$\partial_t u = \frac{1}{2}\Delta u + c\sin(\beta u + \theta) + \xi,$$
where $c, \beta, \theta$ are real-valued constants, and $\xi$ is space-time white noise. The space dimension is fixed to 2. In the proof of existence of solutions, the thresholds $\beta^2 = \frac{n}{n+1}8\pi$ again play a role in determining convergence of certain terms.

== Supersymmetric sine-Gordon model ==
A supersymmetric extension of the sine-Gordon model also exists. Integrability preserving boundary conditions for this extension can be found as well.

== Physical applications ==
The sine-Gordon model arises as the continuum limit of the Frenkel–Kontorova model which models crystal dislocations.

Dynamics in long Josephson junctions are well-described by the sine-Gordon equations, and conversely provide a useful experimental system for studying the sine-Gordon model.

The sine-Gordon model is in the same universality class as the effective action for a Coulomb gas of vortices and anti-vortices in the continuous classical XY model, which is a model of magnetism. The Kosterlitz–Thouless transition for vortices can therefore be derived from a renormalization group analysis of the sine-Gordon field theory.

The sine-Gordon equation also arises as the formal continuum limit of a different model of magnetism, the quantum Heisenberg model, in particular the XXZ model.

== See also ==
- Josephson effect
- Fluxon
- Shape waves
