= Bäcklund transform =

Mathematical tool

In mathematics, Bäcklund transforms or Bäcklund transformations (named after the Swedish mathematician Albert Victor Bäcklund) relate partial differential equations and their solutions. They are an important tool in soliton theory and integrable systems. A Bäcklund transform is typically a system of first order partial differential equations relating two functions, and often depending on an additional parameter. It implies that the two functions separately satisfy partial differential equations, and each of the two functions is then said to be a Bäcklund transformation of the other.

A Bäcklund transform which relates solutions of the same equation is called an invariant Bäcklund transform or auto-Bäcklund transform. If such a transform can be found, much can be deduced about the solutions of the equation especially if the Bäcklund transform contains a parameter. However, no systematic way of finding Bäcklund transforms is known.

== History ==
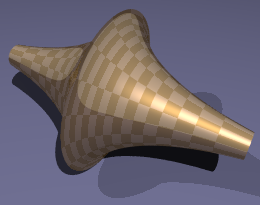
Bäcklund transforms originated as transformations of pseudospheres in the 1880s.

Bäcklund transforms have their origins in differential geometry: the first nontrivial example is the transformation of pseudospherical surfaces introduced by L. Bianchi and A.V. Bäcklund in the 1880s. This is a geometrical construction of a new pseudospherical surface from an initial such surface using a solution of a linear differential equation. Pseudospherical surfaces can be described as solutions of the sine-Gordon equation, and hence the Bäcklund transformation of surfaces can be viewed as a transformation of solutions of the sine-Gordon equation.

== The Cauchy–Riemann equations ==
The prototypical example of a Bäcklund transform is the Cauchy–Riemann system

$$u_x=v_y, \quad u_y=-v_x,\,$$

which relates the real and imaginary parts $u$ and $v$ of a holomorphic function. This first order system of partial differential equations has the following properties.

1. If $u$ and $v$ are solutions of the Cauchy–Riemann equations, then $u$ is a solution of the Laplace equation
  $u_{xx} + u_{yy} = 0$
  (i.e., a harmonic function), and so is $v$. This follows straightforwardly by differentiating the equations with respect to $x$ and $y$ and using the fact that
  $u_{xy}=u_{yx}, \quad v_{xy}=v_{yx}.\,$
2. Conversely if $u$ is a solution of Laplace's equation, then there exist functions $v$ which solve the Cauchy–Riemann equations together with $u$.

Thus, in this case, a Bäcklund transformation of a harmonic function is just a conjugate harmonic function. The above properties mean, more precisely, that Laplace's equation for $u$ and Laplace's equation for $v$ are the integrability conditions for solving the Cauchy–Riemann equations.

These are the characteristic features of a Bäcklund transform. If we have a partial differential equation in $u$, and a Bäcklund transform from $u$ to $v$, we can deduce a partial differential equation satisfied by $v$.

This example is rather trivial, because all three equations (the equation for $u$, the equation for $v$ and the Bäcklund transform relating them) are linear. Bäcklund transforms are most interesting when just one of the three equations is linear.

== The sine-Gordon equation ==
Suppose that u is a solution of the sine-Gordon equation

$$u_{xy} = \sin u.\,$$

Then the system

$$\begin{align}
v_x & = u_x + 2a \sin \Bigl( \frac{v+u}{2} \Bigr) \\
v_y & = -u_y + \frac{2}{a} \sin \Bigl( \frac{v-u}{2} \Bigr)
\end{align} \,\!$$

where a is an arbitrary parameter, is solvable for a function v which will also satisfy the sine-Gordon equation. This is an example of an auto-Bäcklund transform.

By using a matrix system, it is also possible to find a linear Bäcklund transform for solutions of sine-Gordon equation.

== The Liouville equation ==
A Bäcklund transform can turn a non-linear partial differential equation into a simpler, linear, partial differential equation.

For example, if u and v are related via the Bäcklund transform

$$\begin{align}
v_x & = u_x + 2a \exp \Bigl( \frac{u+v}{2} \Bigr) \\
v_y & = -u_y - \frac{1}{a} \exp \Bigl( \frac{u-v}{2} \Bigr)
\end{align} \,\!$$

where a is an arbitrary parameter, and if u is a solution of the Liouville equation

$u_{xy}=\exp u \,\!$

then v is a solution of the much simpler equation, $v_{xy}=0$, and vice versa.

We can then solve the (non-linear) Liouville equation by working with a much simpler linear equation.

== See also ==
- Integrable system
- Korteweg–de Vries equation
- Darboux transformation
