= Transport theorem =

On vector derivatives for rotating frames

The transport theorem (or transport equation, rate of change transport theorem or basic kinematic equation or Bour's formula, named after: Edmond Bour) is a vector equation that relates the time derivative of a Euclidean vector as evaluated in a non-rotating coordinate system to its time derivative in a rotating reference frame. It has important applications in classical mechanics and analytical dynamics and diverse fields of engineering. A Euclidean vector represents a certain magnitude and direction in space that is independent of the coordinate system in which it is measured. However, when taking a time derivative of such a vector one actually takes the difference between two vectors measured at two different times t and t+dt. In a rotating coordinate system, the coordinate axes can have different directions at these two times, such that even a constant vector can have a non-zero time derivative. As a consequence, the time derivative of a vector measured in a rotating coordinate system can be different from the time derivative of the same vector in a non-rotating reference system. For example, the velocity vector of an airplane as evaluated using a coordinate system that is fixed to the earth (a rotating reference system) is different from its velocity as evaluated using a coordinate system that is fixed in space. The transport theorem provides a way to relate time derivatives of vectors between a rotating and non-rotating coordinate system, it is derived and explained in more detail in rotating reference frame and can be written as:

$$\frac{\mathrm{d}}{\mathrm{d}t}\boldsymbol{f} = \left[ \left(\frac{\mathrm{d}}{\mathrm{d}t}\right)_{\mathrm{r}} + \boldsymbol{\Omega} \times \right] \boldsymbol{f} \ .$$

Here f is the vector of which the time derivative is evaluated in both the non-rotating, and rotating coordinate system. The subscript r designates its time derivative in the rotating coordinate system and the vector Ω is the angular velocity of the rotating coordinate system.

The Transport Theorem is particularly useful for relating velocities and acceleration vectors between rotating and non-rotating coordinate systems.

Reference states: "Despite of its importance in classical mechanics and its ubiquitous application in engineering, there is no universally-accepted name for the Euler derivative transformation formula [...] Several terminology are used: kinematic theorem, transport theorem, and transport equation. These terms, although terminologically correct, are more prevalent in the subject of fluid mechanics to refer to entirely different physics concepts." An example of such a different physics concept is Reynolds transport theorem.

== Derivation ==
Let ${\boldsymbol b}_i:=T^E_B{\boldsymbol e}_i$ be the basis vectors of $B$, as seen from the reference frame $E$, and denote the components of a vector ${\boldsymbol f}$ in $B$ by just $f_i$. Let

$$G:=T' \cdot T^{-1}$$

so that this coordinate transformation is generated, in time, according to $T'=G\cdot T$. Such a generator differential equation is important for trajectories in Lie group theory. Applying the product rule with implict summation convention,

$${\boldsymbol f}' = (f_i {\boldsymbol b}_i)' = (f_iT)'{\boldsymbol e}_i = (f_i'T + f_i G\cdot T)\,{\boldsymbol e}_i = (f_i' + f_i G)\,{\boldsymbol b}_i = \left( \left(\tfrac{\mathrm{d}}{\mathrm{d}t}\right)_B + G \right) \boldsymbol{f}$$

For the rotation groups ${\mathrm{SO}}(n)$, one has $T^B_E:=(T^E_B)^{-1}=(T^E_B)^T$. In three dimensions, $n=3$, the generator $G$ then equals the cross product operation from the left, a skew-symmetric linear map $[{\boldsymbol \Omega}_E]_\times {\boldsymbol g} := {\boldsymbol \Omega}_E\times {\boldsymbol g}$ for any vector ${\boldsymbol g}$. As a matrix, it is also related to the vector as seen from $B$ via

$$[{\boldsymbol \Omega}_E]_\times = [T^E_B{\boldsymbol \Omega}_B]_\times = T^E_B\cdot[{\boldsymbol \Omega}_B]_\times\cdot T^B_E$$
