= Josephson vortex =

Quantum vortex of superconducting currents

In superconductivity, a Josephson vortex (after Brian Josephson from Cambridge University) is a quantum vortex of supercurrents in a Josephson junction (see Josephson effect). The supercurrents circulate around the vortex center which is situated inside the Josephson barrier, unlike Abrikosov vortices in type-II superconductors, which are located in the superconducting condensate.

Abrikosov vortices (after Alexei Abrikosov) in superconductors are characterized by normal cores where the superconducting condensate is destroyed on a scale of the superconducting coherence length ξ (typically 5-100 nm) . The cores of Josephson vortices are more complex and depend on the physical nature of the barrier. In Superconductor-Normal Metal-Superconductor (SNS) Josephson junctions there exist measurable superconducting correlations induced in the N-barrier by proximity effect from the two neighbouring superconducting electrodes. Similarly to Abrikosov vortices in superconductors, Josephson vortices in SNS Josephson junctions are characterized by cores in which the correlations are suppressed by destructive quantum interference and the normal state is recovered. However, unlike Abrikosov cores, having a size ~ξ, the size of the Josephson ones is not defined by microscopic parameters only. Rather, it depends on supercurrents circulating in superconducting electrodes, applied magnetic field etc. In Superconductor-Insulator-Superconductor (SIS) Josephson tunnel junctions the cores are not expected to have a specific spectral signature; they were not observed.

Usually the Josephson vortex's supercurrent loops create a magnetic flux which equals, in long enough Josephson junctions, to Φ_{0}—a single flux quantum. Yet fractional vortices may also exist in Superconductor-Ferromagnet-Superconductor Josephson junctions or in junctions in which superconducting phase discontinuities are present. It was demonstrated by Hilgenkamp et al. that Josephson vortices in the so-called 0-π Long Josephson Junctions can also carry half of the flux quantum, and are called semifluxons. It has been shown that under certain conditions a propagating Josephson vortex can initiate another Josephson vortex. This effect is called flux cloning (or fluxon cloning). Although a second vortex appears, this does not violate the conservation of the single flux quantum.

== See also ==
- Fluxon
- Josephson effect
- Josephson penetration depth
- Long Josephson junction
- Shape waves
- Sine-Gordon equation
