= Edmond Bour =

French engineer

Jacques Edmond Émile Bour
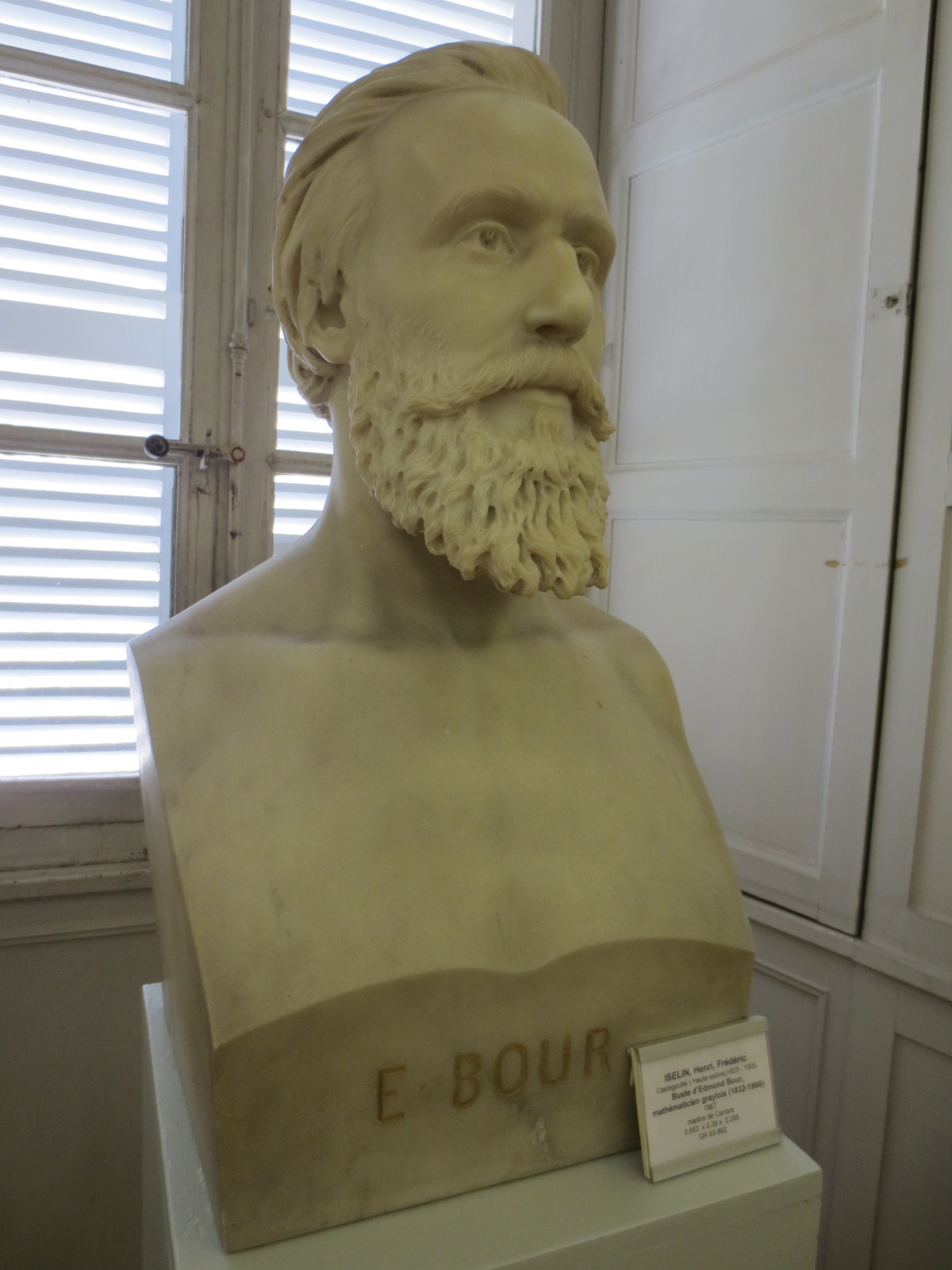
- Born: 19 May 1832; Gray, France
- Died: 8 March 1866 (aged 33); Val-de-Grâce, France
- Citizenship: France
- Known for: Sine-Gordon equation
- Scientific career
- Fields: Mathematics
- Institutions: French Academy of Sciences
- Thesis: Mémoire sur le problème des trois corps (1855)

Jacques Edmond Émile Bour (French: [buʁ]; 19 May 1832 – 8 March 1866) was a French engineer famous for the Bour formula, also known as the transport theorem. His parents were Joseph Bour and Gabrielle Jeunet.

He was a student at l'École Polytechnique and graduated at the top of his class in 1852. After teaching for a year as a professor at l'École des Mines de Saint-Étienne, he became a professor of engineering at l'École Polytechnique. In 1858 he obtained the grand prize in mathematics from the Académie des Sciences for his treatise on L'intégration des équations aux dérivées partielles des premier et deuxième degrés. Most of his work was on the deformation of surfaces, and in particular, he introduced the sine–Gordon equation in 1862.

Bour died on March 8, 1866, in his thirty-fourth year, at Val-de-Grâce from an illness activated, if not provoked, by the fatigues of two long journeys, one to Algeria, for the observation of the eclipse of July 18, 1860, the other to Asia Minor, during the summer of 1863, for long metallurgical explorations.

== See also ==
- Bour's minimal surface
