= Bour's minimal surface =

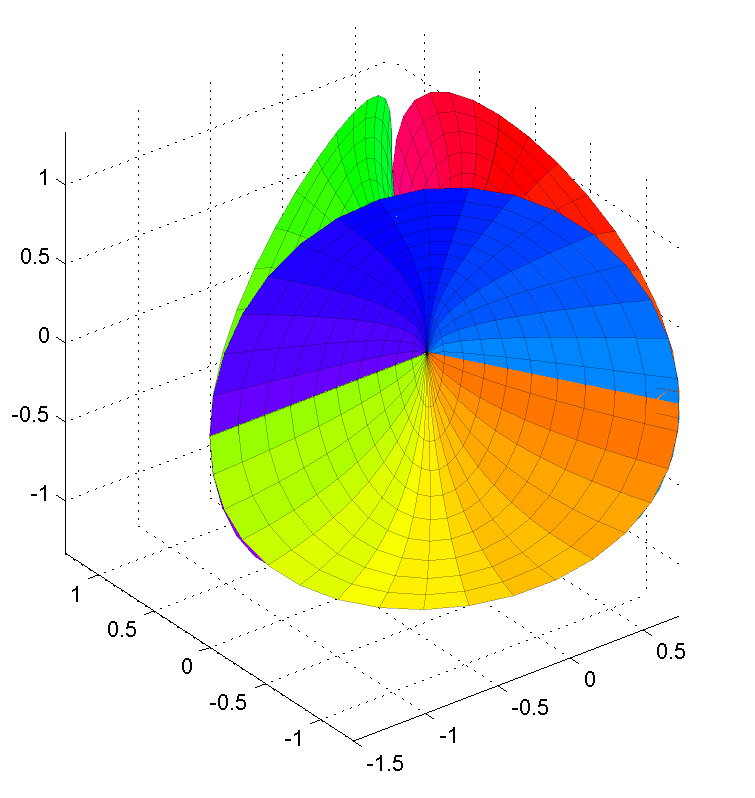
Bour's surface.

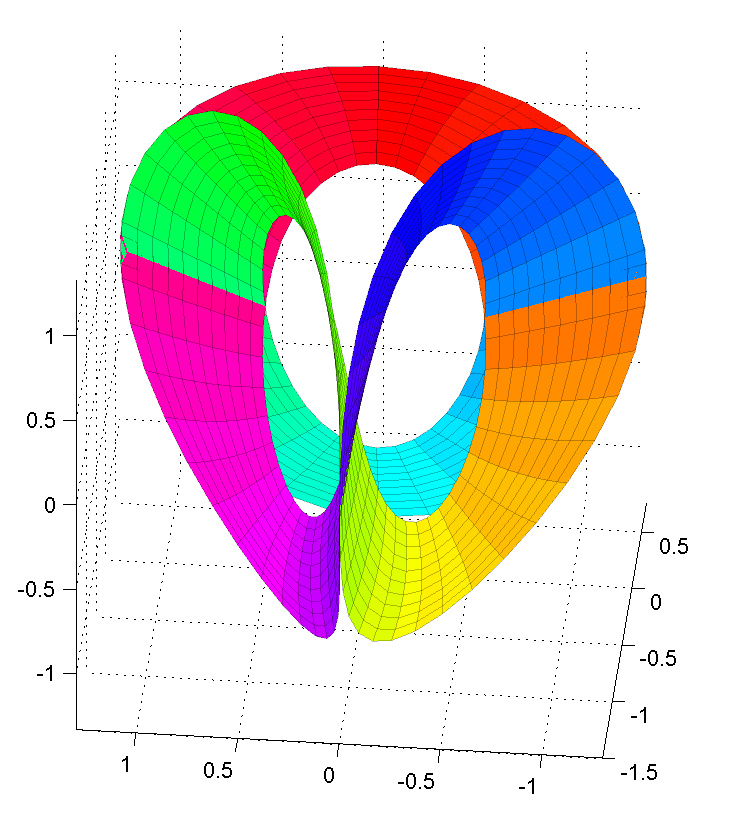
Bour's surface, leaving out the points with r < 0.5 to show the self-crossings more clearly.

In mathematics, Bour's minimal surface is a two-dimensional minimal surface, embedded with self-crossings into three-dimensional Euclidean space. It is named after Edmond Bour, whose work on minimal surfaces won him the 1861 mathematics prize of the French Academy of Sciences.

== Description ==
Bour's surface crosses itself on three coplanar rays, meeting at equal angles at the origin of the space. The rays partition the surface into six sheets, topologically equivalent to half-planes; three sheets lie in the halfspace above the plane of the rays, and three below. Four of the sheets are mutually tangent along each ray.

== Equation ==
The points on the surface may be parameterized in polar coordinates by a pair of numbers (r, θ). Each such pair corresponds to a point in three dimensions according to the parametric equations
$$\begin{align}
x(r,\theta) &= r\cos(\theta) - \tfrac{1}{2}r^2 \cos(2\theta) \\
y(r,\theta) &= -r\sin(\theta)(r \cos(\theta) + 1) \\
z(r,\theta) &= \tfrac{4}{3}r^{3/2} \cos\left(\tfrac{3}{2}\theta\right).
\end{align}$$
The surface can also be expressed as the solution to a polynomial equation of order 16 in the Cartesian coordinates of the three-dimensional space.

== Properties ==
The Weierstrass–Enneper parameterization, a method for turning certain pairs of functions over the complex numbers into minimal surfaces, produces this surface for the two functions $f(z)=1, g(z)=\sqrt{z}$. It was proved by Bour that surfaces in this family are developable onto a surface of revolution.
