= Emily Coddington Williams =

American historian of mathematics

Emily Coddington Williams (born Emily Matilda Coddington, October 21, 1873 – August 8, 1952) was an American historian of mathematics, translator, novelist, playwright, and biographer.

== Early life and education ==
Coddington was born on October 21, 1873, in New York City; her parents were of well-off colonial stock. Her father, a lawyer, died in 1876, and she came to live in Midtown Manhattan with her mother and grandmother. She passed the entrance examination for Harvard University in 1891, allowing her to study at the Harvard Annex, a precursor to Radcliffe College. Instead, she went to the University of London from 1894 to 1896, and earned a bachelor's degree there. In 1898, Columbia University awarded her a master's degree in mathematics, minoring in mechanics and Greek, based on a thesis she wrote at the end of her studies in London concerning the history of determinants.

She completed a Ph.D. at Columbia in 1905. Her dissertation, A Brief Account of the Historical Development of Pseudospherical Surfaces from 1827 to 1887, concerned the history of non-Euclidean geometry and the pseudosphere,^{[b]} also including material on a paper of Albert Victor Bäcklund on hyperbolic geometry, which she translated from Swedish into English.^{[a]}

Beginning in 1909 Coddington studied law at New York University, gaining admission to the bar in 1912 and earning a law degree in 1913. Although Coddington did not become a professional mathematician or lawyer, she remained a lifelong member of the American Mathematical Society, and attended the 1908 and 1912 International Congresses of Mathematicians in England and Italy, respectively.

== Later life ==
Coddington married businessman William Henry Williams in 1917, and her subsequent publications were under the name Emily Coddington Williams. She participated in several clubs concerning gardening and women's suffrage, and traveled frequently to Europe. With her husband, she continued to live in New York, summering in Newport, Rhode Island. They were childless, although her husband had adopted Irma Williams, his niece, after Irma's mother died in childbirth in 1901.

Williams was the author of two one-act plays, Then (1914)^{[c]} and Pals (1925),^{[d]} two novels, Homing Pigeon (1927)^{[e]} and Quest for Love (1929)^{[f]} and a 1941 biography of William Coddington (1601–1678), governor of Rhode Island.^{[g]}

Her husband died in 1943. In 1952, Williams set sail for Europe on the RMS Queen Mary, but she broke her hip while on board, and died in a hospital in Paris on August 8, 1952, leaving a large legacy to her godchildren and the societies she belonged to. Her Newport estate, Villa Rosa, was sold to a real estate developer who demolished it and replaced it with a condominium complex.

== Works ==
a.	Bäcklund, A. V. (1899), Concerning surfaces with constant negative curvature, translated by Coddington, E. M., New Era Printing Co., translation of Bäcklund, A. V. (1883), "Om ytor med konstant negativ krökning", Lunds universitets års-skrift (in Swedish), 19 (4): 1–48, hdl:2027/hvd.32044106310147

b.	Coddington, Emily (1905), A Brief Account of the Historical Development of Pseudospherical Surfaces from 1827 to 1887, New Era Printing Co.

c.	Coddington, Emily (1914), Then (one-act play)

d.	Williams, Emily Coddington (1925), Pals (one-act play), J. J. Little and Ives Co.

e.	Williams, Emily Coddington (1927), Homing Pigeon, The MacCaulay Co.

f.	Williams, Emily Coddington (1929), Quest for Love, The MacCaulay Co.

g.	Williams, Emily Coddington (1941), William Coddington of Rhode Island: A Sketch, Merrymount Press
