= Albert Victor Bäcklund =

Swedish mathematician and physicist

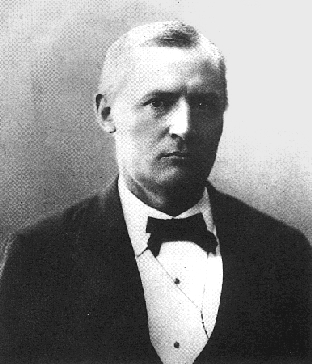
- Albert Victor Bäcklund
- Born: 11 January 1845; Väsby parish, Höganäs Municipality, Malmöhus County (today Skåne County)
- Died: 23 February 1922 (aged 77); Lund, Lund Municipality, Skåne County
- Known for: Auto-Bäcklund transformation
- Scientific career
- Fields: Mathematics, physics, astronomy

Albert Victor Bäcklund (11 January 1845 – 23 February 1922) was a Swedish mathematician and physicist. He was a professor at Lund University and its rector from 1907 to 1909.

He was born in Malmöhus County, now Skåne County, in southern Sweden and became a student at the nearby University of Lund in 1861. In 1864 he started to work for the observatory, and received his Ph.D. in 1868 working on methods to obtain the latitude of a place by astronomical observations. He was awarded the title of associate professor in Mechanics and Mathematical Physics in 1878, and elected Fellow of the Swedish Academy of Science in 1888. In 1897 he became a full professor.

In 1874 he was awarded a travel grant to study abroad for six months. He went to the universities at Leipzig and Erlangen to work with Felix Klein and Ferdinand von Lindemann.

His most important work was in the field of transformations pioneered by Sophus Lie. He improved greatly the understanding of contact transformations and introduced a new second class transformation, now known as auto-Bäcklund transformation.

== See also ==
- Bäcklund transform
- Emily Coddington Williams, translator of Bäcklund's work on non-Euclidean geometry
