= Long Josephson junction =

In superconductivity, a long Josephson junction (LJJ) is a Josephson junction which has one or more dimensions longer than the Josephson penetration depth $\lambda_J$. This definition is not strict.

In terms of underlying model a short Josephson junction is characterized by the Josephson phase $\phi(t)$, which is only a function of time, but not of coordinates i.e. the Josephson junction is assumed to be point-like in space. In contrast, in a long Josephson junction the Josephson phase can be a function of one or two spatial coordinates, i.e., $\phi(x,t)$ or $\phi(x,y,t)$.

== Simple model: the sine-Gordon equation ==
The simplest and the most frequently used model which describes the dynamics of the Josephson phase $\phi$ in LJJ is the so-called perturbed sine-Gordon equation. For the case of 1D LJJ it looks like:

$\lambda_J^2\phi_{xx}-\omega_p^{-2}\phi_{tt}-\sin(\phi) =\omega_c^{-1}\phi_t - j/j_c,$

where subscripts $x$ and $t$ denote partial derivatives with respect to $x$ and $t$, $\lambda_J$ is the Josephson penetration depth, $\omega_p$ is the Josephson plasma frequency, $\omega_c$ is the so-called characteristic frequency and $j/j_c$ is the bias current density $j$ normalized to the critical current density $j_c$. In the above equation, the r.h.s. is considered as perturbation.

Usually for theoretical studies one uses normalized sine-Gordon equation:

$\phi_{xx}-\phi_{tt}-\sin(\phi)=\alpha\phi_t - \gamma,$

where spatial coordinate is normalized to the Josephson penetration depth $\lambda_J$ and time is normalized to the inverse plasma frequency $\omega_p^{-1}$. The parameter $\alpha=1/\sqrt{\beta_c}$ is the dimensionless damping parameter ($\beta_c$ is McCumber-Stewart parameter), and, finally, $\gamma=j/j_c$ is a normalized bias current.

=== Important solutions ===
- Small amplitude plasma waves. $\phi(x,t)=A\exp[i(kx-\omega t)]$
- Soliton (a.k.a. fluxon, Josephson vortex):
$\phi(x,t)=4\arctan\exp\left(\pm\frac{x-ut}{\sqrt{1-u^2}}\right)$

Here $x$, $t$ and $u=v/c_0$ are the normalized coordinate, normalized time and normalized velocity. The physical velocity $v$ is normalized to the so-called Swihart velocity $c_0=\lambda_J\omega_p$, which represent a typical unit of velocity and equal to the unit of space $\lambda_J$ divided by unit of time $\omega_p^{-1}$.
