= Darboux transformation =

Mathematical method

In mathematics, the Darboux transformation, named after Gaston Darboux (1842–1917), is a method of generating a new equation and its solution from the known ones. It is widely used in inverse scattering theory, in the theory of orthogonal polynomials, and as a way of constructing soliton solutions of the KdV hierarchy. From the operator-theoretic point of view, this method corresponds to the factorization of the initial second order differential operator into a product of first order differential expressions and subsequent exchange of these factors, and is thus sometimes called the single commutation method in mathematics literature. The Darboux transformation has applications in supersymmetric quantum mechanics.

== History ==
The idea goes back to Carl Gustav Jacob Jacobi.

== Method ==
Let $y = y(x)$ be a solution of the equation

$$-y''(x) + q(x)y(x) = \lambda y(x)$$

and $y = z(x)$ be a fixed strictly positive solution of the same equation for some $\lambda = \lambda_0$. Then for $\lambda \ne \lambda_0$,

$$Y(x) := y'(x) - \frac{z'(x)}{z(x)}y(x) = z(x) \left( \frac{y(x)}{z(x)} \right)'$$

is a solution of the equation

$$-Y''(x) + Q(x)Y(x) = \lambda Y(x),$$

where $Q(x) = q(x) - 2\left( \frac{z'(x)}{z(x)} \right)'.$ Also, for $\lambda = \lambda_0$, one solution of the latter differential equation is $1/z(x)$ and its general solution can be found by d'Alembert's method:

$$Y(x) = \frac{1}{z(x)} \left( C_1 + C_2 \int^x z^2(x) dx \right),$$

where $C_1$ and $C_2$ are arbitrary constants.

== Eigenvalue problems ==
Darboux transformation modifies not only the differential equation but also the boundary conditions. This transformation makes it possible to reduce eigenparameter-dependent boundary conditions to boundary conditions independent of the eigenvalue parameter – one of the Dirichlet, Neumann or Robin conditions. On the other hand, it also allows one to convert inverse square singularities to Dirichlet boundary conditions and vice versa. Thus Darboux transformations relate eigenparameter-dependent boundary conditions with inverse square singularities.
