= Fluxon =

Quantum of electromagnetic flux

In physics, a fluxon is a quantum of electromagnetic flux.

In the context of superconductivity, in type II superconductors, fluxons (also known as Abrikosov vortices) can form when the applied field lies between $B_{c_1}$ and $B_{c_2}$. The fluxon is a small whisker of normal phase surrounded by superconducting phase, and supercurrents circulate around the normal core. The magnetic field through such a whisker and its neighborhood, which has size of the order of London penetration depth $\lambda_L$ (~100 nm), is quantized because of the phase properties of the magnetic vector potential in quantum electrodynamics, see magnetic flux quantum for details.

In the context of long Superconductor-Insulator-Superconductor Josephson tunnel junctions, a fluxon (a.k.a. Josephson vortex) is made of circulating supercurrents and has no normal core in the tunneling barrier. Supercurrents circulate just around the mathematical center of a fluxon, which is situated with the (insulating) Josephson barrier. Again, the magnetic flux created by circulating supercurrents is equal to a magnetic flux quantum $\Phi_0$ (or less, if the superconducting electrodes of the Josephson junction are thinner than $\lambda_L$).
